

Deaths in January

2: Ian Greaves
2: Joe Henry
2: Ryuzo Hiraki
3: Sam McQuagg
4: Lei Clijsters
4: Ivan Gubijan
4: Giselle Salandy
5: Carl Pohlad
5: Dale Livingston
5: Pascal Terry
6: Charlie Thomson
7: Alfie Conn, Sr.
8: Zbigniew Podlecki
9: Dave Roberts
9: Frank Williams
10: Rob Gauntlett
10: René Herms
10: Gil Mains
10: Jack Wheeler
10: Sidney Wood
11: Bob Kilby
11: Freddie Mack
11: Jon Tvedt
12: Russ Craft
12: Friaça
13: Tommy Casey
13: Preston Gómez
13: Lanny Kean
14: Mike Derrick
14: Leo Rwabwogo
14: Gennadiy Shatkov
15: Tommy Jones
16: Joe Erskine
16: Claudio Milar
17: Mike Parkinson
17: Marjorie Parker Smith
17: Tomislav Crnković
19: José Torres
19: Joop Wille
20: Johnny Dixon
20: Joe Domnanovich
20: Dante Lavelli
21: Pat Crawford
21: Vic Crowe
21: Shane Dronett
21: Finn Kobberø
21: Peter Persidis
22: Bill Herchman
22: Clément Pinault
22: Billy Werber
24: Kay Yow
24: Fernando Cornejo
24: Karl Koller
25: Ed Lyons
26: Jerry Fowler
26: John Isaacs
26: Don Ladner
27: Billy Wilson
27: Aubrey Powell
28: Gene Corbett
28: Glenn "Jeep" Davis
28: Gyula Pálóczi
29: Hélio Gracie
29: Roy Saunders
30: John Gordy
30: Safar Iranpak
30: Ingemar Johansson
31: Eddie Logan

Current sporting seasons

American football 2008
NFL Playoffs

Auto racing 2008

A1 Grand Prix
GP2 Asia Series

Speedcar Series

Rolex Sports Car Series

Basketball 2008–09
NBA
Euroleague
EuroCup
EuroChallenge
NCAA men
NCAA women
Australia
Greece
Iran
Israel
Italy
Philippines
Philippine Cup
Spain
Spanish 2nd division
Turkey

Cricket 2008–09

Football (soccer)
2008–09
England
Germany
Iran
Italy
Spain
France

UEFA (Europe) Champions League
UEFA Cup
2010 FIFA World Cup Qualifying

Golf 2009
European Tour
PGA Tour

Ice hockey 2008–09
National Hockey League
Champions Hockey League
Kontinental Hockey League

Rugby union 2008–09
Heineken Cup
English Premiership
Celtic League
Top 14

Winter sports
Alpine Skiing World Cup
Biathlon World Cup
Bobsleigh World Cup
Cross-Country Skiing World Cup
Freestyle Skiing World Cup
Luge World Cup
Nordic Combined World Cup
Short Track Speed Skating World Cup
Skeleton World Cup
Ski Jumping World Cup
Snowboard World Cup
Speed Skating World Cup

Days of the month

January 31, 2009 (Saturday)

American football
NCAA Bowl Games:
2009 Texas vs. The Nation Game in El Paso, Texas:
The Nation 27, Texas 24
In college football's season finale, Florida Atlantic's Frantz Joseph, with a 26-yard interception and a 32-yard fumble return, led The Nation team to a 27–24 victory over the Texas squad. Joseph was also named the game's defensive Most Valuable Player.

Cricket
India in Sri Lanka:
2nd ODI at Colombo:
 256/9 (50 ov);  241 (49.2 ov). India win by 15 runs and lead 5-match series 2–0.
Zimbabwe in Kenya:
3rd ODI in Nairobi:
 234 (49.3 ov);  236/6 (48.2 ov). Zimbabwe win by 4 wickets and win 5-match series 3–0.

Mixed martial arts
UFC 94 in Las Vegas

Tennis
Australian Open in Melbourne, day 13:(seeding in parentheses)
Women's singles final:
Serena Williams  (2) beat Dinara Safina  (3) 6–0, 6–3
Serena Williams wins her fourth Australian Open and tenth Grand Slam title, and will claim the Women's World #1 ranking.
Men's doubles final:
Bob Bryan /Mike Bryan  (2) beat Mahesh Bhupathi /Mark Knowles  (3) 2–6, 7–5, 6–0
The Bryans win their third Australian Open and seventh Grand Slam men's doubles title.

Winter sports

Alpine skiing
Men's World Cup in Garmisch-Partenkirchen, Germany:
Downhill: cancelled
Women's World Cup in Garmisch-Partenkirchen, Germany:
Super giant slalom: postponed to February 1.

Cross-country skiing
World Cup in Rybinsk, Russia:
Women sprint freestyle: (1) Pirjo Muranen  (2) Arianna Follis  (3) Magda Genuin 
Overall World Cup standings (after 21 of 33 races): (1) Aino-Kaisa Saarinen  1220 points (2) Petra Majdič  1090 Virpi Kuitunen  1069
Men sprint freestyle: (1) Renato Pasini  (2) Alexei Petukhov  (3) Anton Gafarov 
Overall World Cup standings (after 21 of 33 races): (1) Dario Cologna  906 points (2) Petter Northug  698 (3) Axel Teichmann  649

Freestyle skiing
World Cup in Deer Valley, Park City, Utah, United States:
Half-pipe men:
Half-pipe women:
Dual moguls men:
Dual moguls women:

Nordic combined
World Cup in Chaux-Neuve, France:
10 km Gundersen: (1) Magnus Moan  26min 06sec 8/10 (25th) (2) Anssi Koivuranta  at 9.2 (1st) (3) Bjorn Kircheisen  32.9 (8th)
Overall World Cup standings (after 14 of 22 events): (1) Koivuranta 853 points (2) Moan 801 (3) Kircheisen 709

Ski jumping
World Cup in Sapporo, Japan:
134m hill: (1) Gregor Schlierenzauer  253.3 points (133.0/120.5m) (2) Thomas Morgenstern  216.9 (112.0/123.5) (3) Wolfgang Loitzl  211.2 (112.0/119.5)
Schlierenzauer wins fourth World Cup in a row.
Overall World Cup standings (after 18 events): (1) Schlierenzauer 1420 points, (2) Simon Ammann  1248, (3) Loitzl 1166

Snowboarding
World Cup in Bayrischzell/Sudelfeld, Germany:
Parallel GS men: (1) Andreas Prommegger  (2) Matthew Morrison  (3) Sylvain Dufour 
Parallel GS women: (1) Doris Guenther  (2) Amelie Kober  (3) Nicolien Sauerbreij

Speed skating
World Cup 7 in Erfurt, Germany:
Men's 500 m:
Men's 1500 m
Women's 500 m:
Women's 3000 m:

January 30, 2009 (Friday)

Cricket
South Africa in Australia:
5th ODI in Perth:
 288/6 (50 ov);  249 (49 ov). South Africa win by 39 runs and win the series 4–1.

Football (soccer)
UNCAF Nations Cup in Tegucigalpa, Honduras:
Semifinals:
 1–0 
 0–1

Handball
World Men's Championship in Croatia
Semifinals:
 22–27 
 29–23

Tennis
Australian Open in Melbourne, day 12:(seeding in parentheses)
Men's singles semifinals:
Rafael Nadal  (1) beat Fernando Verdasco  (14) 6–7 (4), 6–4, 7–6 (2), 6–7 (1), 6–4
Women's doubles final:
Serena Williams /Venus Williams  (10) beat Daniela Hantuchová /Ai Sugiyama  (9) 6–3, 6–3
The Williams sisters win their third Australian Open and eighth Grand Slam title.

Winter sports

Alpine skiing
Women's World Cup in Garmisch-Partenkirchen, Germany:
Slalom: (1) Lindsey Vonn  1:47.17 (52.49 + 54.68) (2) Maria Riesch  at 0.90 (53.05 + 55.02) (3) Marusa Ferk  1.16 (53.61 + 54.72)
World Cup overall standings (after 21 of 34 races): (1) Vonn 1014 pts (2) Riesch 890 (3) Kathrin Zettel  & Anja Paerson  775

Cross-country skiing
World Cup in Rybinsk, Russia:
Women 10 km freestyle: (1) Marianna Longa  25min 22.6sec (2) Arianna Follis  at 0.4sec (3) Stephanie Böhler  1.6
Overall World Cup standings (after 20 of 33 races): (1) Aino-Kaisa Saarinen  1170 points (2) Petra Majdič  1054 (3) Virpi Kuitunen  1045
Men 15 km freestyle: (1) Tobias Angerer  36:05.9 (2) Jean Marc Gaillard  0.7 (3) Sergei Dolidovich  1.0
Overall World Cup standings (after 20 of 33 races): (1) Dario Cologna  906 points (2) Petter Northug  698 (3) Axel Teichmann  649

Freestyle skiing
World Cup in Deer Valley, Park City, Utah, United States:
Aerials men: (1) Ryan St. Onge  254.89 points (2) Zhongquin Liu  249.79 (3) Steve Omischl  247.92
Aerials women: (1) Li Nina  194.67 points (2) Guo Xinxin  191.54 (3) Emily Cook  178.21

Speed skating
World Cup 7 in Erfurt, Germany:
Men's 500 m: (1) Yu Fengtong  35.03 (2) Keiichiro Nagashima  35.04 (3) Tucker Fredricks  35.12
Men's 5000 m: (1) Sven Kramer  6:16.02 (2) Håvard Bøkko  6:22.37 (3) Bob de Jong  6:23.45
Women's 500 m: (1) Jenny Wolf  37.58 (2) Yu Jing  38.18 (3) Jin Peiyu  38.30
Women's 1500 m: (1) Anni Friesinger  1:56.90 (2) Daniela Anschütz-Thoms  1:58.13 (3) Ireen Wüst  1:58.54

January 29, 2009 (Thursday)

Basketball
Euroleague Top 16, week 1:
Group E:
AJ Milano  76–74  Olympiacos
Group F:
Maccabi Tel Aviv   96–65  ALBA Berlin
Group G:
Panathinaikos  81–63  Partizan Igokea
Lottomatica Roma  75–88  Unicaja Málaga
Group H:
Fenerbahçe Ülker  48–66  CSKA Moscow

Cricket
Zimbabwe in Kenya:
2nd ODI in Mombasa:
 351/7 (50 ov);  200 (45.1 ov). Zimbabwe win by 151 runs and lead 5-match series 2–0.

Football (soccer)
UNCAF Nations Cup in Tegucigalpa, Honduras:
Fifth place:
 2–0 
Nicaragua qualify to CONCACAF Gold Cup.

Handball
World Men's Championship in Croatia
5th/6th Placement Match:
 25–28 
7th/8th Placement Match:
 37–29 
9th/10th Placement Match:
 27–34 
11th/12th Placement Match:
 31–32

Tennis
Australian Open in Melbourne, day 11:(seeding in parentheses)
Men's singles semifinals:
Roger Federer  (2) bt Andy Roddick  (7) 6–2, 7–5, 7–5
Women's singles semifinals:
Serena Williams  (2) bt Elena Dementieva  (4) 6–3, 6–4
Dinara Safina  (3) bt Vera Zvonareva  (7) 6–3, 7–6 (4)

Winter sports

Freestyle skiing
World Cup in Deer Valley, Park City, Utah, United States:
Moguls men: (1) Guilbaut Colas  24.62 (2) Alexandre Bilodeau  24.20 (3) Patrick Deneen  23.99
Moguls women: (1) Hannah Kearney  22.91 (2) Michelle Roark  21.75 (3) Margarita Marbler  20.80

January 28, 2009 (Wednesday)

Basketball
Euroleague Top 16, week 1:
Group E:
TAU Cerámica  99–77  Asseco Prokom Sopot
Group F:
Real Madrid  85–83  Regal FC Barcelona
Group H:
Cibona Zagreb  88–81  Montepaschi Siena

Cricket
India in Sri Lanka:
1st ODI at Dambulla:
 246/7 (50 ov);  247/4 (48.1 ov). India win by 6 wickets and lead 5-match series 1–0.

Ice hockey
Champions Hockey League Finals, second leg:
ZSC Lions  5–0  Metallurg Magnitogorsk
Lions win 7–2 on aggregate

Tennis
Australian Open in Melbourne, day 10:(seeding in parentheses)
Men's singles quarterfinals:
Rafael Nadal  (1) bt Gilles Simon  (6) 6–2, 7–5, 7–5
Fernando Verdasco  (14) bt Jo-Wilfried Tsonga  (5) 7–6 (2), 3–6, 6–3, 6–2
Women's singles quarterfinals:
Serena Williams  (2) bt Svetlana Kuznetsova  (8) 5–7, 7–5, 6–1
Elena Dementieva  (4) bt Carla Suárez Navarro  6–2, 6–2

January 27, 2009 (Tuesday)

Cricket
Zimbabwe in Kenya:
1st ODI in Mombasa:
 306/7 (50 ov);  197 (46.2 ov). Zimbabwe win by 109 runs and lead 5-match series 1–0.

Football (soccer)
UNCAF Nations Cup in Tegucigalpa, Honduras:
Group 2:
 1–0 
Panama advance to the semifinals and qualify to CONCACAF Gold Cup. Guatemala will play for 5th place.

Handball
World Men's Championship in Croatia:(teams in bold advance to the semifinals)
Group I:
 28–27 
 26–27 
 19–22 
Group II:
 28–32 
 25–27 
 31–30 
13th/14th Placement Match:
 28–24 
15th/16th Placement Match:
 42–38 
17th/18th Placement Match:
 23–29 
19th/20th Placement Match:
 27–34 
21st/22nd Placement Match:
 24–27 
23rd/24th Placement Match:
 19–23

Tennis
Australian Open in Melbourne, day 9:(seeding in parentheses)
Men's singles quarterfinals:
Roger Federer  (2) bt Juan Martín del Potro  (8) 6–3, 6–0, 6–0
Andy Roddick  (7) bt Novak Djokovic  (3) 6–7 (3), 6–4, 6–2, 2–1, retired
Women's singles quarterfinals:
Dinara Safina  (3) bt Jelena Dokić  6–4, 4–6, 6–4
Vera Zvonareva  (7) bt Marion Bartoli  (16) 6–3, 6–0

Winter sports

Alpine skiing
Men's World Cup in Schladming, Austria:
Slalom: (1) Reinfried Herbst  1:37.32 ( 47.73 + 49.59) (2) Manfred Pranger  1:38.48 ( 48.31 + 50.17) (3) Ivica Kostelic  1:38.55 ( 48.83 + 49.72)
World Cup overall standings (after 25 of 37 races): (1) Kostelic 735 pts (2) Benjamin Raich  660 Jean-Baptiste Grange  656

January 26, 2009 (Monday)

Cricket
South Africa in Australia:
4th ODI in Adelaide:
 222 (48 ov);  223/2 (38.1 ov). South Africa wins by 8 wickets, and wins series, 3–1 with one match remaining.

Football (soccer)
UNCAF Nations Cup in Tegucigalpa, Honduras:
Group 1:
 1–1 
 2–0 
Honduras and El Salvador advance to the semifinals and qualify to CONCACAF Gold Cup. Nicaragua will play in 5th place playoff.

Handball
World Men's Championship in Croatia:
President's Cup–Group I:
 24–27 
 30–23 
 32–40 
President's Cup–Group II:
 30–27 
 34–33 
 27–31

Tennis
Australian Open in Melbourne, day 8:(seeding in parentheses)
Men's singles 4th round:
Rafael Nadal  (1) bt Fernando González  (13) 6–3, 6–2, 6–4
Fernando Verdasco  (14) bt Andy Murray  (4) 2–6, 6–1, 1–6, 6–3, 6–4
Jo-Wilfried Tsonga  (5) bt James Blake  (9) 6–4, 6–4, 77-63
Gilles Simon  (6) bt Gaël Monfils  (12) 6–4, 2–6, 6–1, retired
Women's singles 4th round:
Serena Williams  (2) bt Victoria Azarenka  (13), 3–6, 4–2, retired
Elena Dementieva  (4) bt Dominika Cibulková  (18), 6–2, 6–2
Svetlana Kuznetsova  (8) bt Zheng Jie  (22) 4–1, retired
Carla Suárez Navarro  bt Anabel Medina Garrigues  (21) 6–3, 6–2

Winter sports

Alpine skiing
Women's World Cup in Cortina d'Ampezzo, Italy:
Super giant slalom: (1) Jessica Lindell-Vikarby  1:25.13 (2) Andrea Fenninger  1:25.94 (2) Andrea Dettling  1:26.00
World Cup overall standings (after 20 of 34 races): (1) Lindsey Vonn  914 pts (2) Maria Riesch  810 (3) Anja Paerson  & Kathrin Zettel  775

January 25, 2009 (Sunday)

Auto racing
Sports cars endurance racing:
24 Hours of Daytona in Daytona Beach, Florida, United States:
(1) David Donohue  Antonio García  Darren Law  Buddy Rice 
(2) Juan Pablo Montoya  Scott Pruett  Memo Rojas 
(3) João Barbosa  Terry Borcheller  J. C. France  Hurley Haywood 
In the closest contested finish in the history of major international 24-hour endurance racing, the No. 58 Brumos Racing-run Riley–Porsche held off the No. 01 Chip Ganassi Racing with Felix Sabates-run Riley-Lexus by just 0.167 seconds after .

Cycling
UCI ProTour:
Tour Down Under:
Stage 6, Adelaide City Council Circuit, 90 km: (1) Francesco Chicchi  Liquigas 1hr 42min 00, (2) Robbie McEwen  same time, (3) Graeme Brown  s.t.
Final standing: (1) Allan Davis  19hr 26min 59sec, (2) Stuart O'Grady  at 25secs, (3) Jose Rojas  30 ...29. Lance Armstrong  49

Football (soccer)
UNCAF Nations Cup in Tegucigalpa, Honduras:
Group 2:
 1–3 
Costa Rica advance to the semifinals.

Golf
PGA Tour:
Bob Hope Classic in Palm Desert, California:
Winner: Pat Perez  327 (−33)
European Tour:
Qatar Masters in Doha, Qatar:
Winner: Álvaro Quirós  269 (−19)
LPGA Tour:
HSBC LPGA Brasil Cup in Brazil:
Winner: Catriona Matthew  138 (−6)

Handball
World Men's Championship in Croatia:(teams in bold advance to the semifinals)
Group I:
 31–25 
 21–30 
 30–31 
Group II:
 32–24 
 25–24 
 23–35 
President's Cup–Group I:
 31–19 
 27–34 
 27–17 
President's Cup–Group II:
 31–30 
 15–34 
 28–29

Ice hockey
NHL All-Star Game in Montreal, Canada:
East 12, West 11 (OT)

Rugby union
Heineken Cup Pool stage, week 6:(teams in bold advance to the quarterfinals)
Pool 1:
Montauban  13–39 (Ireland) Munster
 Munster, assured of a quarterfinal berth last weekend, secure a home quarterfinal.
Pool 2:
Leinster (Ireland) 12–3  Edinburgh
 Leinster's win and Wasps' loss send the Irish through as pool winners.
Castres  21–15  London Wasps
 A Castres try four minutes from time eliminates Wasps from European competition, which also assure  Ospreys a quarterfinal spot.
Pool 5:
Bath  3–3  Toulouse
 A dour draw played in a downpour at The Rec sees both teams go through to the quarterfinals.
Glasgow Warriors  13–10  Newport Gwent Dragons
 Quarterfinal matchups (to be played weekend of 10–12 April):
 (1) Cardiff Blues  –  Toulouse (8)
 (2) Munster (Ireland) –  Ospreys (7)
 (3) Harlequins  – (Ireland) Leinster (6)
 (4) Leicester Tigers  –  Bath (5)

Tennis
Australian Open in Melbourne, day 7:(seeding in parentheses)
Men's singles 4th round:
Roger Federer  (2) bt Tomáš Berdych  (20) 4–6, 6–7 (4), 6–4, 6–4 6–2
Novak Djokovic  (3) bt Marcos Baghdatis  6–1, 7–6 (1), 6–7 (5), 6–2
Andy Roddick  (7) bt Tommy Robredo  (21) 7–5, 6–1, 6–3
Juan Martín del Potro  (8) bt Marin Čilić  (19) 5–7, 6–4, 6–4, 6–2
Women's singles 4th round:
Marion Bartoli  (16) bt Jelena Janković  (1) 6–1 6–4
Dinara Safina  (3) bt Alizé Cornet  (15) 6–2, 2–6, 7–5
Vera Zvonareva  (7) bt Nadia Petrova  (10) 7–5, 6–4
Jelena Dokić  bt Alisa Kleybanova  (29) 7–5, 5–7, 8–6

Winter sports

Alpine skiing
Men's World Cup in Kitzbühel, Austria:
Slalom: (1) Julien Lizeroux  1min 33.83sec (46.88 + 46.95) (2) Jean-Baptiste Grange  1:33.91 (45.88 + 48.03) (3) Patrick Thaler  1:34.50 (47.20 + 47.30)
Combined: (1) Silvan Zurbriggen  3min 33.38sec (2) Ivica Kostelic  3:33.87 (3) Natko Zrnčić-Dim  3:36.36
World Cup overall standings (after 24 of 38 races): (1) Kostelic 675 pts (2) Benjamin Raich  660 (3) Grange 656
Women's World Cup in Cortina d'Ampezzo, Italy:
Giant slalom: (1) Kathrin Zettel  2:47.10 (1:19.47 + 1:27.63) (2) Michaela Kirchgasser  2:48.49 (1:20.18 + 1:28.31) (3) Elisabeth Görgl  2:48.81 (1:19.09 + 1:29.72)
World Cup overall standings (after 19 races): (1) Lindsey Vonn  882 pts (2) Maria Riesch  810 (3) Anja Pärson  775

Bandy
World Championship in Västerås, Sweden:
Final:  6–1 
Match for 3rd place:  5–7 
Qualification for Group A:  3–1

Biathlon
World Cup 6 in Antholz, Italy:
Women's 12.5 km Mass Start: (1) Ekaterina Iourieva  36min 37.8sec (0) (2) Helena Jonsson  at 13.4sec (1) (3) Kaisa Maekaerainen (FIN) 27.8 (2) ... 7. Magdalena Neuner  46.0 (5)
Neuner had a comfortable lead going to the last shoot, but she missed all 5 targets and finished in seventh place.
Overall World Cup standings (after 14 of 26 races): (1) Iourieva 567 points (2) Kati Wilhelm  520 (3) Neuner 502
Men's 15 km Mass Start: (1) Christoph Stephan  37:19.9 (1 penalty) (2) Dominik Landertinger  at 0.2 (3) (3) Ivan Tcherezov  2.8 (2)
Overall World Cup standings (after 14 of 26 races): (1) Emil Hegle Svendsen  568 points (2) Tomasz Sikora  554 (3) Carl-Johan Bergman  456

Cross-country skiing
World Cup in Otepää, Estonia:
Men's classic sprint: (1) Ola Vigen Hattestad  (2) Øystein Pettersen  (3) Boerre Naess 
Overall World Cup standings (after 19 of 33 races): (1) Dario Cologna  880 points (2) Petter Northug  698 (3) Axel Teichmann  631
Women's classic sprint: (1) Petra Majdič  (2) Aino-Kaisa Saarinen  (3) Virpi Kuitunen 
Overall World Cup standings (after 19 of 33 races): (1) Saarinen 1138 points (2) Majdic 1043 (3) Kuitunen 1027

Figure skating
United States Championships in Cleveland, Ohio:
Men: (1) Jeremy Abbott 241.89pts (2) Brandon Mroz 229.70 (3) Evan Lysacek 229.10

Freestyle skiing
World Cup in Mont Gabriel, Canada:
Aerials men: (1) Steve Omischl  242.45 pts (2) Timofei Slivets  240.95 (3) Thomas Lambert  233.95
Aerials women: (1) Lydia Lassila  185.94 pts (2) Cheng Shuang  181.18 (3) Zhao Shanshan  170.41

Luge
World Cup 7 in Altenberg, Germany:
Men: (1) Armin Zöggeler  (2) Felix Loch  (3) David Möller 
World Cup standings (after 7 of 9 races): (1) Zöggeler 601 points (2) Möller 525 (3) Jan Eichhorn  430

Ski jumping
World Cup in Vancouver, British Columbia, Canada:
140m hill: (1) Gregor Schlierenzauer  293.2pts (137.5/149.0 m), (2) Thomas Morgenstern  291.7 (140.5/141.0), (3) Ville Larinto  272.3 (137.0/149.0)
Schlierenzauer scores third win in a row and fifth in six events.
World Cup standings (17 of 28 rounds): (1) Schlierenzauer 1320pts, (2) Simon Ammann  1212, (3) Wolfgang Loitzl  1106

Speed skating
World Cup 6 in Kolomna, Russia:
Men:
100 m: (1) Yuya Oikawa  09.61 (2) Joji Kato  09.66 (3) Zhang Zhongqi  09.81
500 m: (1) Tucker Fredricks  34.81 (2) Keiichiro Nagashima  34.87 (3) Yu Fengtong  34.89
1000 m: (1) Denny Morrison  1:08.53 (2) Stefan Groothuis  1:08.67 (3) Mark Tuitert  1:09.09
Women:
100 m: (1) Jenny Wolf  10.33 (2) Judith Hesse  10.56 (3) Xing Aihua  10.59
500 m: (1) Jenny Wolf  37.67 (2) Jin Peiyu  38.01 (3) Yu Jing  38.13
1000 m: (1) Margot Boer  1:15.79 (2) Anni Friesinger  1:15.81 (3) Christine Nesbitt  1:15.85

January 24, 2009 (Saturday)

College Football bowl game
2009 Senior Bowl, Mobile, Alabama
South 35, North 18
West Virginia's Pat White led the all-star South squad to a 35–18 victory in the annual game.

Cricket
Sri Lanka in Pakistan:
3rd ODI in Lahore:
 309/5 (50 ov);  75 (22.5 ov). Sri Lanka win by 234 runs and win the 3-match series 2–1.
Pakistan's 75 is the lowest ever score in an ODI at Gaddafi Stadium.

Cycling
UCI ProTour:
Tour Down Under:
Stage 5, Snapper Point – Willunga, 148 km: (1) Allan Davis  3hr 28min 33sec, (2) Jose Rojas  same time, (3) Martin Elmiger  s.t.
Overall standings: (1) Davis 17hr 44min 59sec, (2) Stuart O'Grady  at 25secs, (3) Rojas 30 ... 29. Lance Armstrong  49

Football (soccer)
UNCAF Nations Cup in Tegucigalpa, Honduras:
Group 1:
 1–4 
 4–1 
Honduras advance to the semifinals.

Handball
World Men's Championship in Croatia:
Group I:
 23–20 
 27–20 
 28–21 
Group II:
 27–29 
 32–28 
 35–35 
President's Cup–Group I:
 26–25 
 10–42 
 39–28 
President's Cup–Group II:
 28–21 
 28–22 
 25–22

Rugby union
Heineken Cup Pool stage, week 6:(teams in bold advance to the quarterfinals)
Pool 1:
Sale Sharks  26–17  Clermont
Pool 3:
Ospreys  15–9  Leicester Tigers
 Leicester's bonus-point loss is enough to put the Tigers top of the group. Ospreys would qualify as one of the two best runners-up after the next day's results.
Benetton Treviso   16–48  Perpignan
Pool 4:
Harlequins   29–24  Scarlets
 Quins' bonus-point win improves their chances of a home quarterfinal.
Stade Français  24–19 (Ireland) Ulster

Tennis
Australian Open in Melbourne, day 6:(top 10 seeds results; seeding in parentheses)
Men's singles 3rd round:
Rafael Nadal  (1) bt Tommy Haas  6–4, 6–2, 6–2
Andy Murray  (4) bt Jürgen Melzer  (31) 7–5, 6–0, 6–3
Jo-Wilfried Tsonga  (5) bt Dudi Sela  6–4, 6–2, 1–6, 6–1
Gilles Simon  (6) bt Mario Ančić  7–6 (2), 6–4, 6–2
James Blake  (9) bt Igor Andreev  (18) 6–3, 6–2, 3–6, 6–1
The top 9 seeds are all safely through to the fourth round.
Women's singles 3rd round:
Serena Williams  (2) bt Peng Shuai  6–1, 6–4
Elena Dementieva  (4) bt Samantha Stosur  7–6 (6), 6–4
Svetlana Kuznetsova  (8) bt Alona Bondarenko  (31) 7–6 (7), 6–4

Winter sports

Alpine skiing
Women's World Cup in Cortina d'Ampezzo, Italy:
Downhill: (1) Dominique Gisin  1:16.98 (2) Lindsey Vonn  1:17.13 (3) Anja Pärson  1:17.15
Gisin's win follows her first World Cup victory at Altenmarkt-Zauchensee last week.
World Cup overall standings (after 18 races): (1) Vonn 856 pts (2) Maria Riesch  810 (3) Paerson 762
Men's World Cup in Kitzbühel, Austria:
Downhill: (1) Didier Défago  1:56.09 (2) Michael Walchhofer  1:56.26 (3) Klaus Kröll  1:56.38
Défago, who didn't win a World Cup downhill until last week, wins two prestigious races on the Lauberhorn and Hahnenkamm in succession.
World Cup overall standings (after 22 of 37 races): (1) Benjamin Raich  660 pts (2) Aksel Lund Svindal  610 (3) Defago 595

Bandy
World Championship in Västerås, Sweden:
Semifinals:
 8–3 
 10–4

Biathlon
World Cup 6 in Antholz, Italy:
Women's 10 km Pursuit: (1) Anna Boulygina  32min 49.8sec (2 penalties) (2) Kaisa Maekaerainen  at 2.3 (1) (3) Darya Domracheva  2.3 (2)
Overall World Cup standings (after 13 of 26 events): (1) Ekaterina Iourieva  507 points (2) Svetlana Sleptsova  481 (3) Kati Wilhelm  477
Men's 12.5 km Pursuit: (1) Björn Ferry  33:19.4 (1) (2) Simon Eder  at 17.6sec (0) (3) Emil Hegle Svendsen  24.7 (3)
Overall World Cup standings (after 13 of 26 events): (1) Svendsen 568 points (2) Tomasz Sikora  518 (3) Carl-Johan Bergman  436

Cross-country skiing
World Cup in Otepää, Estonia:
Women's 10 km classic: (1) Justyna Kowalczyk  26:25.6 (2) Aino-Kaisa Saarinen  26:51.8 (3) Virpi Kuitunen  27:12.2
World Cup overall standings: (1) Saarinen 1058 points (2) Kuitunen 967 (3) Kowalczyk 954
Men's 15 km classic: (1) Lukáš Bauer  35min 43.5sec (2) Johan Olsson  at 1.5 (3) Vincent Vittoz  9.3
World Cup overall standings (after 18 of 33 events): (1) Dario Cologna  880 points (2) Petter Northug  698 (3) Axel Teichmann  631

Figure skating
European Championships in Helsinki, Finland:
Ladies: (1) Laura Lepistö  167.32 (1, 2) (2) Carolina Kostner  165.42 (3, 1) (3) Susanna Pöykiö  156.31 (2, 3)
United States Championships in Cleveland, Ohio:
Pairs: (1) Keauna McLaughlin/Rockne Brubaker 178.76 (2) Caydee Denney/Jeremy Barrett 176.27 (3) Rena Inoue/John Baldwin 171.08
Ice dance: (1) Meryl Davis/Charlie White 201.68 (2) Emily Samuelson/Evan Bates 181.64 (3) Kimberly Navarro/Brent Bommentre 176.30
Ladies: (1) Alissa Czisny 178.06 pts (2) Rachael Flatt 173.78 (3) Caroline Zhang 171.08

Freestyle skiing
World Cup in Mont Gabriel, Canada:
Moguls men: (1) Vincent Marquiz  25.77 (2) Alexandre Bilodeau  25.50 (3) Pierre-Alexandre Rousseau  25.39
Moguls women: (1) Aiko Uemura  25.53 (2) Jennifer Heil  25.51 (3) Hannah Kearney  24.89

Luge

World Cup 7 in Altenberg, Germany:
Doubles: (1) Christian Oberstolz/Patrick Gruber  (2) Patric Leitner/Alexander Resch  (3) Andreas Linger/Wolfgang Linger 
World Cup standings (after 7 of 9 races): (1) Oberstolz/Gruber 580 pts (2) Leitner/Resch 484 (3) Linger/Linger 470
Women's: (1) Natalie Geisenberger  (2) Tatjana Hüfner  (3) Anke Wischnewski 
World Cup standings (after 7 of 9 races): (1) Hüfner 670 pts (2) Geisenberger 600 (3) Wischnewski 462

Ski jumping
World Cup in Vancouver, British Columbia, Canada:
140m hill: (1) Gregor Schlierenzauer  289.2 points (142.0/139.5m) (2) Wolfgang Loitzl  274.1 (136.5/135.5) (3) Matti Hautamaeki  270.6 (136.5/135.5)
Schlierenzauer set a hill record with his first jump of 142m. His 4th win in 5 events lift him to the top of the World Cup standings.
Overall World Cup standings (after 16 of 28 events): (1) Schlierenzauer 1,220 points (2) Simon Ammann  1,172 (3) Loitzl 1,061

Snowboarding
World Championship in Gangwon-do, South Korea:
Big air men: (1) Markku Koski  55.6 points (2) Seppe Smits  53.0 (3) Stefan Gimpl  51.0

Speed skating
World Cup 6 in Kolomna, Russia:
Men:
500 m: (1) Keiichiro Nagashima  34.85 (2) Yu Fengtong  34.89 (3) Yuya Oikawa  34.96
1000 m: (1) Denny Morrison  1:08.71 (2) Stefan Groothuis  1:08.97 (3) Yevgeny Lalenkov  1:09.02
Women:
500 m: (1) Jenny Wolf  37.51 (2) Annette Gerritsen  38.02 (3) Yu Jing  38.17
1000 m: (1) Margot Boer  1:15.84 (2) Yu Jing  1:16.04 (3) Christine Nesbitt  1:16.26

January 23, 2009 (Friday)

American football
NFL News:
Herman Edwards was fired as the head coach of the Kansas City Chiefs.

Cricket
South Africa in Australia:
3rd ODI in Sydney:
 269 (49.2 ov);  270/7 (46.3 ov). South Africa win by 3 wickets, lead 5-match series 2–1.
Zimbabwe in Bangladesh:
3rd ODI in Dhaka:
 119/9 (37 ov);  124/4 (32.3 ov). Bangladesh win by 6 wickets, win 3-match series 2–1.

Cycling
UCI ProTour:
Tour Down Under:
Stage 4, Burnside Village – Angaston, 143 km: (1) Allan Davis  Quick Step 3hr 29min 35sec, (2) Graeme Brown  same time, (3) Jose Rojas  s.t.
Overall standings: (1) Davis 14hr 16min 36sec, (2) Brown at 4secs, (3) Stuart O'Grady  15

Football (soccer)
UNCAF Nations Cup in Tegucigalpa, Honduras:
Group 2:
 3–0

Rugby union
Heineken Cup Pool stage, week 6:(teams in bold advance to the quarterfinals)
Pool 6:
Cardiff Blues  62–20  Calvisano
The Blues win secures them the top seed in the knockout phase.
Biarritz   24–10  Gloucester
Gloucester's defeat by more than seven points and Biarritz's failure to score four tries mean that both teams are eliminated.

Tennis
Australian Open in Melbourne, day 5:(top 10 seeds results; seeding in parentheses)
Men's singles 3rd round:
Roger Federer  (2) bt Marat Safin  (26) 6–3, 6–2, 7–6 (5)
Novak Djokovic  (3) bt Amer Delić  6–2, 4–6, 6–3, 7–6 (4)
Following this match, outside the Rod Laver Arena, Bosnian and Serb fans fought one another, mostly by throwing chairs. (Fox News (USA))
Andy Roddick  (7) bt Fabrice Santoro  6–3, 6–4, 6–2
Juan Martín del Potro  (8) bt Gilles Müller  6–7 (5), 7–5, 6–3, 7–5
Women's singles 3rd round:
Jelena Janković  (1) bt Ai Sugiyama  (26) 6–4, 6–4
Dinara Safina  (3) bt Kaia Kanepi  (25) 6–2, 6–2
Alisa Kleybanova  (29) bt Ana Ivanovic  (5) 7–5, 6–7 (5), 6–2
Vera Zvonareva  (7) bt Sara Errani  6–4, 6–1
Nadia Petrova  (10) bt Galina Voskoboeva  6–1 retired

Winter sports

Alpine skiing
Men's World Cup in Kitzbühel, Austria:
Super giant slalom: (1) Klaus Kröll  1:12.78 (2) Aksel Lund Svindal  1:13.00 (3) Ambrosi Hoffmann  1:13.17
Overall World Cup standings (after 21 of 37 events): (1) Benjamin Raich  638 pts (2) Svindal 598 (3) Jean-Baptiste Grange  576

Biathlon
World Cup 6 in Antholz, Italy:
Men's 10 km Sprint: (1) Emil Hegle Svendsen  24:52.5 (0) (2) Björn Ferry  at 3.6 (0) (3) Tomasz Sikora  6.7 (0)
Overall World Cup standings (after 12 of 26 events): (1) Svendsen 520 points (2) Tomasz Sikora  475 (3) Carl-Johan Bergman  413

Figure skating
European Championships in Helsinki, Finland:
Ice dance final results (free dance in brackets): (1) Jana Khoklova / Sergei Novitski  196.91 (97.31) (2) Federica Faiella / Massimo Scali  186.17 (91.11) (3) Sinead Kerr / John Kerr  185.20 (92.60)
Ladies' short program: (1) Laura Lepistö  56.62 points (2) Susanna Pöykiö  56.06 (3) Carolina Kostner  51.36
United States Championships in Cleveland, Ohio:
Men's short program: (1) Jeremy Abbott 86.40pts (2) Evan Lysacek 83.59 (3) Parker Pennington 76.17

Snowboarding
World Championship in Gangwon-do, South Korea:
Half pipe men: (1) Ryoh Aono  47.3 points, (2) Jeff Batchelor  44.4, (3) Mathieu Crepel  43.3
Half pipe women: (1) Jiayu Liu  43.5 points, (2) Holly Crawford  39.6, (3) Paulina Ligocki  38.5

January 22, 2009 (Thursday)

Baseball
Major League Baseball news:
Tribune Company has sold the Chicago Cubs, Wrigley Field and twenty percent interest in Comcast SportsNet Chicago to the Ricketts family for US $900 million, pending the approval of Major League Baseball.

Basketball
NBA News:
Marc Iavaroni was sacked as the coach of the Memphis Grizzlies, and replaced on an interim basis by Johnny Davis.

Cycling
UCI ProTour:
Tour Down Under:
Stage 3, Unley – Victor Harbor, 136 km: (1) Graeme Brown  Rabobank 3h 15' 35" (2) Allan Davis  Quick Step s.t. (3) Stuart O'Grady  Team Saxo Bank s.t.

Football (soccer)
UNCAF Nations Cup in Tegucigalpa, Honduras:
Group 1:
 1–1 
 2–1

Handball
World Men's Championship in Croatia:(teams in bold advance to the top 12 stage)
Group A:
 28–23 
 27–22 
 36–16 
Group B:
 23–24 
 30–26 
 23–26 
Group C:
 36–30 
 30–23 
 36–25 
Group D:
 25–22 
 32–28 
 38–29

Tennis
Australian Open in Melbourne, day 4:(top 10 seeds results; seeding in parentheses)
Men's singles 2nd round:
Rafael Nadal  (1) bt Roko Karanušić  6–2, 6–3, 6–2
Andy Murray  (4) bt Marcel Granollers  6–4, 6–2, 6–2
Jo-Wilfried Tsonga  (5) bt Ivan Ljubičić  6–7 (4), 7–6 (8), 7–6 (7), 6–2
Gilles Simon  (6) bt Chris Guccione  6–7 (5), 6–4, 6–1, 6–2
James Blake  (9) bt Sébastien de Chaunac  6–3, 6–2, 6–3
Women's singles 2nd round:
Serena Williams  (2) bt Gisela Dulko  6–3, 7–5
Elena Dementieva  (4) bt Iveta Benešová  6–4, 6–1
Carla Suárez Navarro  bt Venus Williams  (6) 2–6, 6–3, 7–5
Svetlana Kuznetsova  (8) bt Tatjana Malek  6–2, 6–2

Winter sports

Bandy
World Championship in Västerås, Sweden:(teams in bold advance to the semifinals)
Group A:
 3–13 
 7–2 
 15–3

Biathlon
World Cup 6 in Antholz, Italy:
Women's 7.5 km Sprint: (1) Tora Berger  21' 25.5" (2) Darya Domracheva  21' 33.6" (3) Kati Wilhelm  21' 46.2"
Overall World Cup standings (after 12 of 26 events): (1) Svetlana Sleptsova  481 points, (2) Ekaterina Iourieva  473, (3) Wilhelm 437

Figure skating
European Championships in Helsinki, Finland:
Men: (1) Brian Joubert  232.01 points (1, 2) (2) Samuel Contestini  220.92 (3, 3) (3) Kevin van der Perren  219.36 (4, 4)
Ice dance (after original dance): (1) Jana Khokhlova / Sergei Novitski  99.60 points (1, 1) (2) Federica Faiella / Massimo Scali  95.06 (2, 2) (3) Sinead Kerr / John Kerr  92.60 (3, 3)
United States Championships in Cleveland, Ohio:
Ladies short programme: (1) Alissa Czisny 65.75 pts (2) Rachael Flatt 60.19 (3) Caroline Zhang 58.91
Pairs short programme: (1) Caydee Denney/Jeremy Barrett 61.51 pts (2) Keauna McLaughlin/Rockne Brubaker 61.12 (3) Rena Inoue/John Baldwin 61.11
Ice dance (after original dance): (1) Meryl Davis/Charlie White 101.86 (2) Emily Samuelson/Evan Bates 93.25 (3) Kimberly Navarro/Brent Bommentre 89.52

January 21, 2009 (Wednesday)

Basketball
NCAA Men's Basketball:
The New Jersey Institute of Technology ended the longest losing streak in Division I Men's Basketball at 57 games by defeating Bryant College, 61–51. The school last won a game against Longwood University on February 19, 2007.

Cricket
Zimbabwe in Bangladesh:
2nd ODI in Dhaka:
 160/9 (50 ov);  164/4 (44.5 ov). Bangladesh win by 6 wickets, 3-match series tied 1–1.
Sri Lanka in Pakistan:
2nd ODI in Karachi:
 290/8 (50 ov);  161 (34.5 ov). Sri Lanka win by 129 runs, 3-match series tied 1–1.

Cycling
UCI ProTour:
Tour Down Under:
Stage 2, Hahndorf – Stirling, 145 km: (1) Allan Davis  Quick Step 3h 46' 25" (2) Graeme Brown  Rabobank s.t. (3) Martin Elmiger  AG2R La Mondiale +2"

Handball
World Men's Championship in Croatia:(teams in bold advance to the Top 12 stage)
Group A:
 26–35 
 31–20 
 20–40 
Group B:
 22–32 
 30–19 
 26–31 
Group C:
 23–33 
 31–27 
 28–29 
Group D:
 17–26 
 26–27 
 24–26

Ice hockey
Champions Hockey League Finals, first leg:
Metallurg Magnitogorsk  2–2  ZSC Lions

Tennis
Australian Open in Melbourne, day 3:(top 10 seeds results; seeding in parentheses)
Men's singles 2nd round:
Roger Federer  (2) def. Evgeny Korolev  6–2, 6–3, 6–1
Novak Djokovic  (3) def. Jérémy Chardy  7–5, 6–1, 6–3
Andy Roddick  (7) def. Xavier Malisse  4–6, 6–2, 7–6, 6–2
Juan Martín del Potro  (8) def. Florian Mayer  6–1, 7–5, 6–2
Lu Yen-hsun  def. David Nalbandian  (10) 6–4, 5–7, 4–6, 6–4, 6–2
Women's singles 2nd round:
Jelena Janković  (1) def. Kirsten Flipkens  6–4, 7–5
Dinara Safina  (3) def. Ekaterina Makarova  6–7 (3), 6–3, 6–0
Ana Ivanovic  (5) def. Alberta Brianti  6–3, 6–2
Vera Zvonareva  (7) def. Edina Gallovits  6–0, 6–0
Nadia Petrova  (10) def. Sania Mirza  6–3, 6–2

Winter sports

Bandy
World Championship in Västerås, Sweden:
Group A:
 5–6 
 2–2 
 1–8

Figure skating
European Championships in Helsinki, Finland:
Pairs: (1) Aliona Savchenko / Robin Szolkowy  199.07 points (2 SP, 1 FS) (2) Yuko Kawaguchi / Alexander Smirnov  182.77 (3, 2) (3) Maria Mukhortova / Maxim Trankov  182.07 (1, 4)
Men's short program: (1) Brian Joubert  86.90 points (2) Tomáš Verner  81.45 (3) Samuel Contesti  75.95
United States Championships in Cleveland, Ohio:
Compulsory Dance: (1) Meryl Davis/Charlie White 39.93 pts (2) Emily Samuelson/Evan Bates 36.28 (3) Kimberly Navarro/Brent Bommentre 35.22

Snowboarding
World Championship in Gangwon-do, South Korea:
Parallel slalom men: (1) Benjamin Karl , (2) Sylvain Dufour , (3) Patrick Bussler 
Parallel slalom women: (1) Fraenzi Maegert-Kohli , (2) Doris Guenther , (3) Ekaterina Tudegesheva

January 20, 2009 (Tuesday)

Cricket
Sri Lanka in Pakistan:
1st ODI in Karachi:
 219 (45.2 ov);  220/2 (45.5 ov). Pakistan win by 8 wickets and lead 3-match series 1–0.

Cycling
UCI ProTour:
Tour Down Under:
Stage 1, Norwood – Mawson Lakes, 140 km: (1) André Greipel  Team Columbia 3h 45' 27" (2) Baden Cooke  UniSA s.t. (3) Stuart O'Grady  Team Saxo Bank s.t.

Tennis
Australian Open in Melbourne, day 2:(top 10 seeds results; seeding in parentheses)
Men's singles 1st round:
Raphael Nadal  (1) def. Christophe Rochus  6–0, 6–2, 6–2
Andy Murray  (4) def. Andrei Pavel  6–2, 3–1 (ret.)
Jo-Wilfried Tsonga  (5) def. Juan Mónaco  6–4, 6–4, 6–0
Gilles Simon  (6) def. Pablo Andújar  6–4, 6–1, 6–1
James Blake  (9) def. Frank Dancevic  6–4, 6–3, 7–5
Women's singles 1st round:
Serena Williams  (2) def. Meng Yuan  6–3, 6–2
Elena Dementieva  (4) def. Kristina Barrois  7–6, 2–6, 6–1
Venus Williams  (6) def. Angelique Kerber  6–3, 6–3
Svetlana Kuznetsova  (8) def. Anastasia Rodionova  6–2, 3–6, 6–3
Kateryna Bondarenko  def. Agnieszka Radwańska  (9) 7–6, 4–6, 6–1

Winter sports

Bandy
World Championship in Västerås, Sweden:
Group A:
 1–12 
 13–2 
 15–3

Figure skating
European Championships in Helsinki, Finland:
Compulsory dance: (1) Jana Khokhlova/Sergei Novitski  37.43 pts (2) Federica Faiella/Massimo Scali  36.03 (3) Sinead Kerr/John Kerr  34.89
Pairs' short program: (1) Maria Mukhortova/Maxim Trankov  69.62 pts (2) Aliona Savchenko/Robin Szolkowy  66.64 (3) Yuko Kawaguchi/Alexander Smirnov  65.38

Snowboarding
World Championship in Gangwon-do, South Korea:
Parallel giant slalom men: (1) Jasey Jay Anderson  (2) Sylvain Dufour  (3) Matthew Morison 
Parallel giant slalom women: (1) Marion Kreiner  (2) Doris Guenther  (3) Patrizia Kummer

January 19, 2009 (Monday)

Cricket
Zimbabwe in Bangladesh:
1st ODI in Dhaka:
 124 (48.1 ov);  127/8 (49.2 ov). Zimbabwe win by 2 wickets and lead 3-match series 1–0.

Handball
World Men's Championship in Croatia:
Group A:
 30–26 
 24–24 
 42–11 
Group B:
 34–19 
 34–30 
 41–20 
Group C:
 29–30 
 32–20 
 36–31 
Group D:
 32–30 
 30–20 
 32–13

Tennis
Australian Open in Melbourne, day 1:(top 10 seeds results; seeding in parentheses)
Men's singles 1st round:
Roger Federer  (2) def. Andreas Seppi  6–1, 7–6 (4), 7–5
Novak Djokovic  (3) def. Andrea Stoppini  6–2, 6–3, 7–5
Andy Roddick  (7) def. Björn Rehnquist  6–0, 6–2, 6–2
Juan Martín del Potro  (8) def. Mischa Zverev  6–3, 6–4, 6–2
David Nalbandian  (10) def. Marc Gicquel  6–4, 4–6, 6–2, 6–3
Women's singles 1st round:
Jelena Janković  (1) def. Yvonne Meusburger  6–1, 6–3
Dinara Safina  (3) def. Alla Kudryavtseva  6–3, 6–4
Ana Ivanovic  (5) def. Julia Görges  7–5, 6–3
Vera Zvonareva  (7) def. Magdaléna Rybáriková  7–6 (2), 6–0
Nadia Petrova  (10) def. Yaroslava Shvedova  6–3, 7–6 (3)

Winter sports

Bandy
World Championship in Västerås, Sweden:
Group A:
 14–2 
 5–0 
 3–4

Freestyle skiing
World Cup in Lake Placid, New York, United States:
Skicross men: (1) Lars Lewens  (2) Patrick Koller  (3) Tomas Kraus 
Skicross women: (1) Ophelie David  (2) Jenny Owens  (3) Meryl Boulangeat

January 18, 2009 (Sunday)

American football
NFL Playoffs, Conference Championship Games:Conference rankings in parentheses
NFC: (4) Arizona Cardinals 32, (6) Philadelphia Eagles 25
 The Cardinals book their first Super Bowl trip behind four Kurt Warner touchdown passes—three to Larry Fitzgerald in the first half, and the last to Tim Hightower after the Cards had blown a 24–6 halftime lead.
AFC: (2) Pittsburgh Steelers 23, (6) Baltimore Ravens 14
 Thanks to Santonio Holmes' 65-yard catch from Ben Roethlisberger and Troy Polamalu 40-yard interception return, the Steelers will attempt to become the first team to win six Lombardi Trophies.

Badminton
BWF Super Series:
Korea Open Super Series in Seoul:(seeding in parentheses)
Men's singles: Peter Hoeg Gade  (3) bt Lee Chong Wei  (1) 21–18, 10–21, 21–17
Women's singles: Tine Rasmussen  (2) bt Pi Hongyan  (4) 21–19, 21–19
Men's doubles: Mathias Boe/Carsten Mogensen  (4) bt Jung Jae-Sung/Lee Yong-Dae  (2) 21–12, 24–22
Women's doubles: Chien Yu Chin/Chieng Wen Hsing  (1) bt Lee Kyung-Won/Lee Hyo-jung  (2) 21–19, 21–8
Mixed doubles: Lee Yong-Dae/Lee Hyo-jung  (2) bt Songphon Anugritayawon/Kunchala Voravichitchaikul  (4) 21–8, 21–7

Cricket
South Africa in Australia:
2nd ODI in Hobart:
 249/9 (50 ov);  244/6 (50 ov). Australia win by 5 runs and level 5-match series 1–1.

Golf
PGA Tour:
Sony Open in Hawaii in Honolulu, Hawaii
Winner:  Zach Johnson 265 (−15)
Champions Tour:
Wendy's Champions Skins Game in Kāanapali, Hawaii:
Winners: Fuzzy Zoeller and Ben Crenshaw (13 skins, US $530,000)
European Tour:
Abu Dhabi Golf Championship in Abu Dhabi, United Arab Emirates
Winner:  Paul Casey 267 (−21)

Snooker
Masters in London, United Kingdom:
Final: (2) Ronnie O'Sullivan  def. (1) Mark Selby  10–8

Handball
World Men's Championship in Croatia:
Group A:
 12–47 
 27–30 
 26–33 
Group B:
 20–45 
 34–19 
 21–40 
Group C:
 19–32 
 24–26 
 22–24 
Group D:
 21–39 
 18–26 
 36–37

Rugby union
Heineken Cup pool stage, week 5:(teams in bold advance to the quarterfinals)
Pool 4:
Scarlets  31–17  Stade Français
 Stade's loss secures first place in the pool and a quarterfinal berth for  Harlequins.
Pool 5:
Newport Gwent Dragons  12–15  Bath
 Bath set up a showdown with  Toulouse next weekend, with first place in the pool on the line.
Pool 6:
Gloucester  12–16  Cardiff Blues
 The Blues, playing a man down from the 25th minute, come from behind and claim a quarterfinal berth with a converted try from Bradley Davies in the 76th minute.

Winter sports

Alpine skiing
Men's World Cup in Wengen, Switzerland:
Slalom: (1) Manfred Pranger  1:40.36 (48.10 + 52.26) (2) Reinfried Herbst  1:40.70 (48.44 + 52.26) (3) Ivica Kostelic  1:40.75 (48.80 + 51.95)
Overall World Cup standings (after 20 of 38 races): (1) Benjamin Raich  638 pts (2) Jean-Baptiste Grange  576 (3) Kostelic 546
Women's World Cup in Altenmarkt–Zauchensee, Austria:
Downhill: (1) Anja Paerson  & Dominique Gisin  1:47.52 (3) Lindsey Vonn  1:47.69
Overall World Cup standings (after 17 of 35 races): (1) Vonn 776 pts (2) Maria Riesch  765 (3) Paerson 702

Bandy
World Championship in Västerås, Sweden:
Group A:
 19–0 
 8–1 
 7–5

Biathlon
World Cup 5 in Ruhpolding, Germany:
Women's 10 km Pursuit: (1) Magdalena Neuner  32:56.5 (4), (2) Ekaterina Iourieva  at 8.9s (1), (3) Kati Wilhelm  21.7 (3)
Overall World Cup standings (after 11 of 26 races): (1) Svetlana Sleptsova  481 points, (2) Iourieva 461, (3) Neuner 409
Men's 12.5 km Pursuit: (1) Ole Einar Bjørndalen  36min 17.4sec (1) (2) Emil Hegle Svendsen  34.4 (1) (3) Dominik Landertinger  46.5 (2)
Overall World Cup standings (after 11 of 26 races): (1) Svendsen 460 points (2) Tomasz Sikora  427 (3) Bjørndalen 408

Bobsleigh
World Cup 6 and European Championships at Sankt Moritz, Switzerland:
Four-man: (1) Alexandre Zoubkov, Roman Oreshnikov, Dmitry Trunenkov, Dmitriy Stepushkin  2:10.48 (1:05.20/1:05.28) (2) Thomas Florschütz, Marc Kühne, Andreas Barucha, Alex Metzger  2:10.79 (1:05.61/1:05.18) (3) Karl Angerer, Andreas Udvari, Thomas Pöge, Gregor Bermbach  2:10.81 (1:05.53/1:05.28)
World Cup standings (after 5 of 7 races): (1) Zoubkov 1046 points (2) André Lange  955 (3) Jānis Miņins  904

Cross-country skiing
World Cup in Vancouver, British Columbia, Canada:
Team sprint men: (1)  19:44.1 (2)  19:44.4 (3)  19:44.7
Team sprint women: (1)  17:20.1 (2)  17:30.0 (3)  17:31.2

Curling
World Curling Tour:
Glynhill Ladies International in Braehead, Glasgow, Scotland:
Women's final:  Jennifer Jones def.  Binia Feltscher-Beeli 7–6

Figure skating
Canadian Championships in Saskatoon, Saskatchewan:
Men: (1) Patrick Chan 254.82 (2) Vaughn Chipeur 206.30 (3) Jeremy Ten 204.03

Freestyle skiing
World Cup in Lake Placid, New York, United States:
Aerials men: (1) Jeret Peterson  252.59 (2) Kyle Nyssen  244.92 (3) Warren Shouldice  243.03
Aerials women: (1) Alla Tsuper  189.98 (2) Xu Mengtao  186.11 (3) Emily Cook  184.70

Luge
World Cup 6 in Oberhof, Germany:
Women: (1) Tatjana Hüfner  (2) Natalie Geisenberger  (3) Anke Wischnewski

Short track speed skating
European Championships in Torino, Italy:
Men's overall standings: (1) Nicola Rodigari  76 (2) Haralds Silovs  55 (3) Viktor Knoch  55
Women's overall standings: (1) Arianna Fontana  83 (2) Katerina Novotná  76 (3) Stéphanie Bouvier  63

Snowboarding
World Championship in Gangwon-do, South Korea:
Snowboardcross men: (1) Markus Schairer  (2) Xavier de Le Rue  (3) Nick Baumgartner 
Snowboardcross women: (1) Helene Olafsen  (2) Olivia Nobs (3) Mellie Francon

Speed skating
World Sprint Championships in Moscow, Russia:
Men's overall standings: (1) Shani Davis  139.560 (2) Keiichiro Nagashima  139.720 (3) Simon Kuipers  140.450
Women's overall standings: (1) Wang Beixing  152.475 (2) Jenny Wolf  153.410 (3) Yu Jing  153.740

January 17, 2009 (Saturday)

American football
NFL News:
Less than 24 hours after sacking Jon Gruden as head coach, the Tampa Bay Buccaneers replace him with defensive backs coach Raheem Morris.
The St. Louis Rams agree to terms with New York Giants defensive coordinator Steve Spagnuolo on a four-year contract to become the team's new head coach.

Auto racing
Rallying:
Dakar Rally in Argentina and Chile:
Cars: (1) Giniel De Villiers  Dirk Von Zitzewitz  48:10:57 (2) Mark Miller  Ralph Pitchford  48:19:56 (3) Robby Gordon  Andy Grider  49:57:12
Trucks: (1) Firdaus Kabirov  Aydar Belyaev  Andrey Mokeev  49:34:46 (2) Vladimir Chagin  Sergey Savostin  Eduard Nikolaev  49:38:25 (3) Gerard De Rooy  Tom Coldoul  Marcel Van Melis  50:34:42
Motorbikes: (1) Marc Coma  52:14:33 (2) Cyril Despres  53:40:11 (3) David Fretigne  53:53:29
Quads: (1) Josef Machacek  68:22:06 (2) Marcos Patronelli  70:56:06 (3) Rafal Sonik  76:04:40

Football (soccer)
Arabian Gulf Cup in Muscat, Oman:
Final:
 0–0 
Oman win 6–5 in penalty shootout

Handball
World Men's Championship in Croatia:
Group A:
 27–25 
 41–17 
 31–21 
Group B:
 47–17 
 41–14 
Group C:
 39–22 
 26–26 
 24–25 
Group D:
 39–23 
 22–30 
 40–27

Mixed martial arts
UFC 93 in Dublin:

Rugby union
Heineken Cup pool stage, week 5:
Pool 2:
London Wasps  19–12 (Ireland) Leinster
Pool 3:
Leicester Tigers  52–0  Benetton Treviso
Perpignan  17–15  Ospreys
Pool 4:
Ulster Rugby (Ireland) 21–10  Harlequins
Pool 5:
Toulouse  26–33  Glasgow
Pool 6:
Calvisano  15–23  Biarritz

Tennis
ATP Tour:
Medibank International Sydney in Sydney, Australia:
Final:  David Nalbandian def.  Jarkko Nieminen 6–3, 6–7 (9/11), 6–2
Heineken Open in Auckland, New Zealand:
Final:  Juan Martín del Potro def.  Sam Querrey, 6–4, 6–4
Exhibition tournaments:
AAMI Kooyong Classic in Melbourne, Australia:
Final:  Roger Federer def.  Stanislas Wawrinka 6–1, 6–3

Winter sports

Alpine skiing
Men's World Cup in Wengen, Switzerland:
Downhill: (1) Didier Défago  2:31.98 (2) Bode Miller  2:32.18 (3) Marco Sullivan  2:32.37
Defago wins his first ever World Cup downhill on the Lauberhorn course as the home crowd celebrate second Swiss victory in two days.
Overall World Cup standings (after 19 of 38 races): (1) Benjamin Raich  593 points (2) Jean-Baptiste Grange  536 (3) Aksel Lund Svindal  518
Women's World Cup in Altenmarkt–Zauchensee, Austria:
Super combined: (1) Lindsey Vonn  2:40.53 (2) Kathrin Zettel   2:40.83 (3) Anja Paerson  2:41.19
Overall World Cup standings (after 16 of 35 races): (1) Maria Riesch  729 points (2) Vonn 716 (3) Zettel 651

Biathlon
World Cup 5 in Ruhpolding, Germany:
Men's 10 km Sprint: (1) Ole Einar Bjørndalen  23:25.8 (0 penalty laps) (2) Dominik Landertinger  at 33.4 (0) (3) Emil Hegle Svendsen  35.3 (1)
World Cup overall standings (after 10 of 26 events): (1) Svendsen 406 points (2) Tomasz Sikora  393 (3) Bjørndalen 348

Bobsleigh
World Cup 6 and European Championships at Sankt Moritz, Switzerland:
Two-man: (1) Pierre Lueders/David Bissett  2:12.08 (1:06.21/1:05.87) (2) André Lange/Martin Putze  2:12.10 (1:06.23/1:05.87) Beat Hefti/Thomas Lamparter  2:12.23 (1:06.36/1:05.87)
European Championship: (1) Lange/Putze (2) Hefti/Lamparter (3) Thomas Florschütz/Marc Kuehne  (4th overall)
World Cup standings (after 6 of 8 races): (1) Hefti 1171 points (2) Lange 1141 (3) Ivo Rüegg  1020

Cross-country skiing
World Cup in Vancouver, British Columbia, Canada:
Men's 15 km classic/15 km freestyle pursuit: (1) Pietro Piller Cottrer  1hr 13min 1.5sec (2) Jean-Marc Gaillard  15.0 (3) Valerio Checci  15.3
Overall World Cup standings (after 17 of 33 events): (1) Dario Cologna  835 points (2) Petter Northug  698 (3) Axel Teichmann  581
Women's 7.5 km classic/7.5 km freestyle Pursuit: (1) Justyna Kowalczyk  40:41.3 (2) Marianna Longa  40:48.9 (3) Arianna Follis  41:27.3
Overall World Cup standings (after 16 of 33 events): (1) Aino-Kaisa Saarinen  978 points (2) Virpi Kuitunen  907 (3) Petra Majdič  893

Figure skating
Canadian Championships in Saskatoon, Saskatchewan:
Women: (1) Joannie Rochette 185.35 (2) Cynthia Phaneuf 151.42 (3) Amélie Lacoste 143.01
Pairs: (1) Jessica Dubé / Bryce Davison 188.43 (2) Meagan Duhamel / Craig Buntin 182.50 (3) Mylène Brodeur / John Mattatall 159.85
Ice dancing: (1) Tessa Virtue / Scott Moir 197.77 (2) Vanessa Crone / Paul Poirier 175.58 (3) Kaitlyn Weaver / Andrew Poje 170.23

Luge
World Cup 6 in Oberhof, Germany:
Men: (1) Jan Eichhorn  (2) Felix Loch  (3) David Möller (GER)
World Cup standings (after 6 of 9 races): (1) Armin Zöggeler  501 points (2) Möller 455 (3) Eichhorn 375
Doubles: (1) Tobias Wendl/Tobias Arlt  (2) Patric Leitner/Alexander Resch  (3) André Florschütz/Torsten Wustlich 
World Cup standings (after 6 of 9 races): (1) Christian Oberstolz/Patrick Gruber  480 points (2) Wendl/Arlt 405 (3) Andreas Linger/Wolfgang Linger  400

Nordic combined
World Cup in Vancouver, British Columbia, Canada:
10 km Gundersen: (1) Magnus Moan  25:18.7 (2) Bjoern Kircheisen  25:19.1 (3) Bill Demong  25:19.2
World Cup standings (after 13 out of 24 races): (1) Anssi Koivuranta  773 points (2) Moan 701 (3) Demong 675

Skeleton
World Cup 6 and European Championships at Sankt Moritz, Switzerland:
Men: (1) Frank Rommel  2:15.77 (1:08.08/1:07.69) (2) Kristan Bromley  2:16.74 (1:08.37/1:08.37) (3) Gregor Stähli  2:16.79 (1:08.36/1:08.43)
World Cup standings (after 5 of 7 events): (1) Aleksandr Tretyakov  924 points (2) Florian Grassl  907 (3) Rommel 900

Ski jumping
World Cup in Zakopane, Poland:
134m hill: (1) Gregor Schlierenzauer  285.7 points (130.5/138.5m) (2) Wolfgang Loitzl  280.7 (130.0/136.5) (3) Simon Ammann  271.2 (127.5/134.0)
World Cup standings (after 15 of 28 events): (1) Ammann 1,122 points (2) Schlierenzauer 1,120 (3) Loitzl 981

January 16, 2009 (Friday)

American football
NFL News:
The Tampa Bay Buccaneers fire head coach Jon Gruden and General Manager Bruce Allen after a disappointing December in which they lost 4 games in a row and missed the playoffs.

Cricket
South Africa in Australia:
1st ODI in Melbourne:
 271/8 (50 ov);  272/7 (49.3 ov). South Africa win by 3 wickets and lead 5-match series 1–0.
Tri-Series in Bangladesh:
Final in Dhaka:
 152 (50 overs);  153/8 (48.1 overs). Sri Lanka win by 2 wickets.
Bangladesh reduce Sri Lanka to 6 for 5 after eight overs, the lowest score ever recorded in ODI history at the fall of the 5th wicket. Sri Lanka fights back to take the Tri-Series with 59 runs from Kumar Sangakkara and 33 not out by Muttiah Muralitharan off 16 balls, including 18 runs in one over.

Handball
World Men's Championship in Croatia:
Group B:
 27–26

Rugby union
Pool stage, week 5:(teams in bold advance to the quarterfinal)
Pool 1:
Munster (Ireland) 37–14  Sale Sharks
Munster get the bonus-point win they need to clinch first place in the pool and advance to the quarterfinals.
Clermont  43–10  Montauban
Pool 2:
Edinburgh Rugby  32–14  Castres

Tennis
WTA Tour:
Medibank International Sydney in Sydney, Australia:
Final:  Elena Dementieva def.  Dinara Safina 6–3, 2–6, 6–1
Dementieva wins two tournaments back-to-back after winning the ASB Classic in Auckland last week.
Moorilla Hobart International in Hobart, Australia:
Final:  Petra Kvitová def.  Iveta Benešová 7–5, 6–1

Winter sports

Alpine skiing
Men's World Cup in Wengen, Switzerland:
Super combined: (1) Carlo Janka  2:34.16 (1:47.15 + 47.01) (2) Peter Fill  2:34.38 (1:47.65 + 46.73) (3) Silvan Zurbriggen  2:34.56 (1:48.16 + 46.40)
Overall World cup standings (after 18 events): (1) Benjamin Raich  593 pts (2) Jean-Baptiste Grange  536 (3) Aksel Lund Svindal  502

Biathlon
World Cup 5 in Ruhpolding, Germany:
Women's 7.5 km Sprint: (1) Magdalena Neuner  23min 26.6sec (1), (2) Kati Wilhelm  at 0.2 (0), (3) Darya Domracheva  14.0 (0)
Overall World Cup standings (after 10 of 26 events): (1) Svetlana Sleptsova  441 points, (2) Ekaterina Iourieva  407, (3) Helena Jonsson  363

Bobsleigh
World Cup 6 and European Championships at Sankt Moritz, Switzerland:
Two-woman: (1) Sandra Kiriasis/Berit Wiacker  2:17.40 (1:09.20/1:08.20) (2) Cathleen Martini/Janine Tischer  2:18.36 (1:09.73/1:08.63) (3) Nicole Minichiello/Gillian Cooke  2:18.75 (1:09.68/1:09.07)
World Cup standings (after 6 of 8 races): (1) Kiriasis 1295 points (2) Martini 1206 (3) Shauna Rohbock  1155

Cross-country skiing
World Cup in Vancouver, British Columbia, Canada:
Men 1.6 km Classic Sprint: (1) Emil Joensson  (2) Ola Vigen Hattestad  (3) Josef Wenzl 
Ladies 1.3 km Classic Sprint: (1) Alena Prochazkova  (2) Justyna Kowalczyk  (3) Anna Olsson

Nordic combined
World Cup in Vancouver, British Columbia, Canada:
10 km Gundersen: (1) Bill Demong  25:07.9 (2) Anssi Koivuranta  25:26.3 (3) Bjoern Kircheisen  25:40.2
World Cup standings (after 12 out of 24 races): (1) Koivuranta 723 points (2) Demong 615 (3) Magnus Moan  601

Skeleton
World Cup 6 and European Championships at Sankt Moritz, Switzerland:
Women: (1) Shelley Rudman  2:20.50 (1:10.53/1:09.97) (2) Mellisa Hollingsworth  2:20.59 (1:10.43/1:10.16) (3) Michelle Kelly  2:21.68 (1:10.95/1:10.73)
European Championship: (1) Rudman (2) Marion Trott  (4th overall) (3) Maya Pedersen  (7th)
World Cup standings (after 5 races): (1) Rudman 972 points (2) Anja Huber  931 (3) Trott 912

Ski jumping
World Cup in Zakopane, Poland:
134m hill: (1) Wolfgang Loitzl  272.7 points (129.5/132.0m), (2) Gregor Schlierenzauer  262.5 (127.5/130.0), (3) Martin Schmitt  249.4 (121.0/129.5)
Overall World Cup standings (after 14 of 28 rounds): (1) Simon Ammann  1062pts, (2) Schlierenzauer 1020, (3) Loitzl 901

January 15, 2009 (Thursday)

Baseball
 Major League Baseball news:
 MLB owners approve two rules changes:
 All postseason games, as well as one-game playoffs, will be played to their conclusion. Games called due to weather will be suspended, regardless of the number of innings played.
 Home-field advantage for one-game playoffs to break ties for division championships or wild-card berths will now be determined by head-to-head record, instead of a coin flip.

Basketball
Euroleague, week 10:(teams in bold advance to the Top 16 stage)
Group A:
Air Avellino  79–75  Cibona Zagreb
Unicaja Málaga  92–69  Maccabi Tel Aviv
Málaga's win secure them top spot in this group.
Olympiacos  68–78  Le Mans
Group C:
TAU Cerámica  91–83  DKV Joventut
ALBA Berlin  59–67  Union Olimpija Ljubljana
ALBA clinch the last spot in the Top 16 despite their loss because Joventut also lost.
Fenerbahçe Ülker  90–86(OT)  Lottomatica Roma

Winter sports

Biathlon
World Cup 5 in Ruhpolding, Germany:
Men's 4 x 7.5 km Relay: (1)  1hr 24min 54.0sec (0), (2)  at 1:20.2 (0), (3)  1:43.1 (0)
World Cup relay standings (after four of six events): (1) Austria 222 points, (2)  190, (3) Germany 182

Bobsleigh
World Cup 4 at Sankt Moritz, Switzerland:
Two-man: (1) Pierre Lueders/David Bissett  2:14.34 (1:07.55/1:06.79) (2) Ivo Rüegg/Roman Handschin  2:14.64 (1:07.78/1:06.86) (3) Beat Hefti/Thomas Lamparter  2:15.08 (1:08.03/1:07.05)
World Cup rankings (after 5 of 8 races): (1) Hefti 971 points (2) André Lange 931  (3) Rüegg 860
Two-woman: (1) Sandra Kiriasis/Berit Wiacker  2:17.34 (1:08.75/1:08.59) (2) Cathleen Martini/Janine Tischer  2:17.36 (1:08.85/1:08.51) (3) Nicole Minichiello/Jackie Gunn  2:17.70 (1:08.75/1:08.95)
World Cup rankings (after 5 of 8 races): (1) Kiriasis 1070 points (2) Martini 996 (3) Shauna Rohbock  979
These races are substitutes for the cancelled races in Cesana Pariol in December.

January 14, 2009 (Wednesday)

American football
 College football news:
 2008 Heisman Trophy winner Sam Bradford announces that he will return for his junior (third) season at Oklahoma; as a third-year sophomore, he was eligible to declare for the 2009 NFL Draft.

Basketball
Euroleague, week 10:(teams in bold advance to the Top 16 stage)
Group B:
Regal FC Barcelona  90–68  Žalgiris Kaunas
SLUC Nancy  79–103  Montepaschi Siena
Panathinaikos Athens  75–53  Asseco Prokom Sopot
Sopot clinch the 4th berth in the Top 16 despite their loss as their rivals, Žalgiris and Nancy, lose as well.
Group D:
CSKA Moscow  63–66  Partizan Belgrade
Real Madrid  80–69  Efes Pilsen
Panionios  77–87  AJ Milano
Partizan Belgrade and Milano clinch berths in the Top 16 with their wins. Efes Pilsen's elimination ends a 12-years streak in the last-16 stage of Euroleague.

Cricket
Tri-Series in Bangladesh:
3rd match in Dhaka:
 147 (30.3/31 ov);  151/5 (23.5/31 ov). Bangladesh win by 5 wickets, and advance to the final on Friday against Sri Lanka.

Football (soccer)
Arabian Gulf Cup in Muscat, Oman:
Semifinals:
 1–0 
 0–1 
News:
Israel police allows the Israeli Premier League match between Bnei Sakhnin F.C. and Hakoah Amidar Ramat Gan F.C. to be played at Sakhnin as scheduled on Saturday. It was earlier reported that due to fear of violence between home Arab fans and visiting Jewish supporters resulted from Israel-Gaza conflict the match would not be played at Sakhnin.

Winter sports

Biathlon
World Cup 5 in Ruhpolding, Germany:
Women's 4 x 6 km Relay: (1)  1hr 16min 41.2sec (0) (2)  at 37.5sec (0) (3)  56.5 (0)
World Cup relay standings (after 4 of 6 events): (1)  234 points (2)  205 (3)  175

Freestyle skiing
World Cup in Flaine, France:
Skicross men: (1) Tomas Kraus  (2) Casey Puckett  (3) Eric Iljans 
Skicross women: (1) Ophelie David  (2) Ashleigh McIvor  (3) Karin Huttary

Snowboarding
World Cup in Gujō, Japan:
Halfpipe men: (1) Ryoh Aono  (2) Ben Mates  (3) Shi Wancheng 
Halfpipe women: (1) Liu Jiayu  (2) Sun Zhifeng  (3) Soko Yamaoka

January 13, 2009 (Tuesday)

Cricket
West Indies in New Zealand:
5th ODI in Napier:
 293/9 (50 ov);  211/5 (35/35 ov). New Zealand win by 9 runs (D/L method) and win the series 2–1.
South Africa in Australia:
2nd T20I in Brisbane
 157/5 (20/20 ov);  161/4 (18.5/20 ov). Australia win by 6 wickets and win the series 2–0.

Football (soccer)
CECAFA Cup in Kampala, Uganda:
Final:
 0–1 
Uganda wins the title for a record tenth time.
Bronze medal match:
 3–2 
News:
Israel Football Association decides to resume play in the top three divisions this weekend for the first time since the start of Israel-Gaza conflict. Lower divisions will still be suspended. Teams whose home grounds are within 40 km of the Gaza Strip will have to play their matches on alternative grounds out of the danger zone. Also, matches between teams from Jewish and Arab towns may be played on neutral grounds by police order for fear of possible crowd violence. Officials of teams that could be affected by this decision, in particular Hapoel Be'er Sheva F.C. and Bnei Sakhnin F.C., say they object to move away from their home grounds.

January 12, 2009 (Monday)

American football
NFL News:
Tony Dungy retires from football as head coach of the Indianapolis Colts. Jim Caldwell, who was named head coach designate in January 2008, takes over Dungy's responsibilities.
Josh McDaniels, offensive coordinator of the New England Patriots, is named the new head coach of the Denver Broncos.

Baseball
Jim Rice and Rickey Henderson are elected to the Hall of Fame by the BBWAA. Henderson enters in his first year of eligibility while Rice enters in his 15th and final year of eligibility, the third player to do so.

Cricket
Tri-Series in Bangladesh:
2nd match in Dhaka:
 210/6 (50 ov);  80 (28.2 ov). Sri Lanka win by 130 runs.

Football (soccer)
2008 FIFA World Player of the Year awards in Zürich, Switzerland:
Men: (1)  Cristiano Ronaldo (Manchester United) (2)  Lionel Messi (Barçelona) (3)  Fernando Torres (Liverpool)
Women: (1)  Marta (Umeå) (2)  Birgit Prinz (Frankfurt) (3)  Cristiane (Corinthians)

January 11, 2009 (Sunday)

American football
NFL Playoffs, Divisional Playoff Round:(Conference rankings in parentheses)NFC: (6) Philadelphia Eagles 23, (1) New York Giants 11
The Eagles victory means the reigning Super Bowl champion will not defend its title for the fourth year in a row. Philadelphia will play at Glendale, Arizona in the NFC Championship Game next Sunday against the Arizona Cardinals.
AFC: (2) Pittsburgh Steelers 35, (4) San Diego Chargers 24.
Willie Parker runs for 146 yards and two touchdowns to lead the Steelers to the win and the right to host their divisional rivals, the Baltimore Ravens, in the AFC Championship Game next week.
College football news:
 Tim Tebow announces he will return for his senior season at Florida.

Badminton
BWF Super Series:
Malaysia Super Series in Kuala Lumpur:(seeding in parentheses)
Men's Singles: Lee Chong Wei  (1) bt Park Sung-hwan  (5) 21–14, 21–13
Women's Singles: Tine Rasmussen  (2) bt Zhou Mi  (1) 21–17, 15–21, 21–16
Mixed Doubles: Nova Widianto/Liliyana Natsir  (1) bt Lee Yong-dae/Lee Hyo-jung  (2) 21–14, 21–19
Women's Doubles: Lee Hyo-jung/Lee Kyung-won  (4) bt Yang Wei/Zhang Jiewen  (5) 21–15, 21–12
Men's Doubles: Jung Jae-sung/Lee Yong-dae  (2) bt Hendra Aprida Gunawan/Alvent Yulianto  18–21, 21–14, 21–14

Cricket
South Africa in Australia:
1st T20I in Melbourne:
 182/9 (20/20 ov);  130 (18/20 ov). Australia win by 52 runs, and lead 1–0 in 2-match series.

Darts
BDO World Championship in Frimley Green, United Kingdom:
Men's Final:  Ted Hankey def.  Tony O'Shea 7–6The Count wins his second World Championship title.

Football (soccer)
CECAFA Cup in Kampala, Uganda:
Semifinals:
 2–1 
 5–0 

Golf
PGA Tour:
Mercedes-Benz Championship in Kapalua, Hawaii:
Winner:  Geoff Ogilvy 268 (−24)
European Tour:
Joburg Open in Johannesburg, South Africa:
Winner:  Anders Hansen 269 (−15)

Tennis
ATP Tour:
Brisbane International in Brisbane, Australia:
Final:  Radek Štěpánek def.  Fernando Verdasco 3–6 6–3 6–4
Chennai Open in Chennai, India:
Final:  Marin Čilić def.  Somdev Devvarman 6–4, 7–6 (7/3)

Winter sports

Alpine skiing
Men's World Cup in Adelboden, Switzerland:
Slalom: (1) Reinfried Herbst  1:42.95 (50.12 + 52.83) (2) Manfred Pranger  1:43.13 (49.14 + 53.99) (3) Felix Neureuther  1:43.27 (50.37 + 52.90)
Overall World Cup standings (after 17 events): (1) Benjamin Raich  557 pts (2) Jean-Baptiste Grange  507 (3) Aksel Lund Svindal  470
Women's World Cup in Maribor, Slovenia:
Slalom: (1) Maria Riesch  1:29.64 (44.78 + 44.86) (2) Kathrin Zettel  1:30.79 (46.07 + 44.72) (3) Tanja Poutiainen  1:31.41 (46.08 + 45.33)
Overall World Cup standings (after 15 of 35 events): (1) Riesch 729 points (2) Poutiainen 644 (3) Lindsey Vonn  616

Biathlon
World Cup 4 in Oberhof, Germany:
12.5 km Mass Start Women: (1) Kati Wilhelm  38min 11.6sec (2 penalties) (2) Olga Medvedtseva  at 1.6sec (2) (3) Helena Jonsson  11.1 (1)
Overall World Cup standings (after nine events): (1) Svetlana Sleptsova  401 points (2) Ekaterina Iourieva  371 (3) Jonsson 331
15 km Mass Start Men: (1) Christoph Sumann  38:11.9 (1+0+1+0) (2) Carl Johan Bergman  38:21.6 (0+0+1+1) (3) Ole Einar Bjørndalen  38:21.8 (0+1+1+0)

Bobsleigh
World Cup 5 in Königssee, Germany:
Four-man: (1)  (Karl Angerer, Andreas Udvari, Alex Mann, Gregor Bermbach) 1:37.84 (48.96/48.88) (2)  (Edwin van Calker, Arnold van Calker, Arno Klaassen, Sybren Jansma) 1:37.93 (48.91/49.02) (3)  (André Lange, Rene Hoppe, Alexander Rödiger, Martin Putze) 1:37.94 (48.78/49.16) &  (Jānis Miņins, Daumants Dreiškens, Oskars Melbardis, Intars Dambis) 1:37.94 (48.83/49.11)
World Cup standings (after 4 of 8 events): (1) Alexandre Zoubkov  821 (2) Lange 803 (3) Minins 760

Curling
Ramada Perth Masters in Perth Scotland:
Men's final:  Kevin Koe 6–5  Thomas Ulsrud
Bernese Ladies Cup in Bern, Switzerland:
Women's final:  Shannon Kleibrink 6–5  Andrea Schöpp
Casino Rama Skins in Rama, Ontario
 Randy Ferbey def.  Glenn Howard

Freestyle skiing
World Cup in Les Contamines, France:
Half-pipe men: (1) Xavier Bertoni  44.60 (2) Nils Lauper  42.00 (3) Kevin Rolland  41.90
Half-pipe women: (1) Virginie Faivre  41.2 (2) Miyuki Hatanaka  36.8 (3) Jessica Reedy  33.6

Luge
World Cup 5 in Cesana Pariol, Italy:
Men: (1) Armin Zöggeler  (2) Felix Loch  (3) Daniel Pfister 
World Cup standings (after 5 of 9 races): (1) Zöggeler 455 (2) David Möller  385 (3) Jan Eichhorn  275

Nordic combined
World Cup in Val di Fiemme, Italy:
10 km Gundersen: (1) Magnus Moan  27:33.1 (13th after ski jump) (2) Jan Schmid  27:37.2 (7) (3) Pavel Churavy  27:37.5 (8)
Overall World Cup standings (after 11 out of 24 races): (1) Anssi Koivuranta  643 points (2) Moan 556 (3) Bill Demong  515

Ski jumping
World Cup in Tauplitz/Bad Mitterndorf, Austria:
200m flying hill: (1) Gregor Schlierenzauer  393.6 points (203.5/202.0m) (2) Harri Olli  390.4 (201.5/200.5) (3) Simon Ammann  382.2 (197.5/198.5)
Overall World Cup standings (after 13 of 28 events): (1) Ammann 1017 points (2) Schlierenzauer 940 (3) Wolfgang Loitzl  801

Snowboarding
World Cup in Bad Gastein, Austria:
Snowboardcross men: (1) Damon Hayler  (2) Markus Schairer  (3) Mike Robertson 
Snowboardcross women: (1) Lindsey Jacobellis  (2) Dominique Maltais  (3) Zoe Gillings 

Speed skating
European Championships in Heerenveen, Netherlands:
Men overall standings: (1) Sven Kramer  148.564 points (2) Håvard Bøkko  150.495 (3) Wouter olde Heuvel  150.629
Women overall standings: (1) Claudia Pechstein  162.014 points (2) Daniela Anschütz-Thoms  162.307 (3) Martina Sáblíková  162.815

January 10, 2009 (Saturday)

American football
NFL Playoffs, Divisional Playoff Round (conference rankings in parentheses):
AFC: (6) Baltimore Ravens 13, (1) Tennessee Titans 10
 Matt Stover's 43-yard field goal with 53 seconds left provides the winning margin, and Joe Flacco becomes the first rookie quarterback in NFL history to win two playoff games. The Ravens will travel to either San Diego or Pittsburgh for next week's AFC title game.
NFC: (4) Arizona Cardinals 33, (2) Carolina Panthers 13
 Jake Delhomme throws five interceptions and loses a fumble, leading to 23 of Arizona's points. The Cardinals will play either Philadelphia Eagles or New York Giants in the NFC Championship Game.

Cricket
West Indies in New Zealand:
4th ODI in Auckland:
 275/4 (50 ov);  64/0 (10.3/40 ov). No result. 5-match series level 1–1.
Tri-Series in Bangladesh:
1st match in Dhaka:
 205/9 (50 ov);  167 (46.2 ov). Zimbabwe win by 38 runs.

Ice hockey
World Women's U18 Championship in Füssen, Germany:
Final:
 3–2(OT) 
Kendal Coyne's eighth goal of the tournament in overtime gives USA their second title in as many women junior world championships.
Bronze medal game:
 9–1 
Game for 5th place:
 1–2 
Game for 7th place:
 2–3(SO) 

Tennis
ATP Tour:
Qatar ExxonMobil Open in Doha, Qatar:
Final:  Andy Murray def.  Andy Roddick 6–4, 6–2
WTA Tour:
Brisbane International in Brisbane, Australia:
Final:  Victoria Azarenka def.  Marion Bartoli 6–3, 6–1
ASB Classic in Auckland, New Zealand:
Final:  Elena Dementieva def.  Elena Vesnina 6–4 6–1
JB Group Classic in Hong Kong:
Gold group final (best of five matches):
Gisela Dulko  (Americas) def. Anna Chakvetadze  (Russia) 3–6, 6–4, 6–4
Venus Williams  (Americas) def. Vera Zvonareva  (Russia) 6–2, 6–2
Venus Williams/Coco Vandeweghe  (Americas) def. Anna Chakvetadze/Alexandra Panova  (Russia) 6–4, 6–1
Americas beat Russia 4–1
Silver group final (best of three matches):
Zheng Jie  (Asia-Pacific) def. Michelle Larcher de Brito  (Europe) 6–1, 6–1
Asia-Pacific beat Europe 3–0

Winter sports

Alpine skiing
Men's World Cup in Adelboden, Switzerland:
Giant slalom: (1) Benjamin Raich  2:24.95 (1:12.33 + 1:12.62) (2) Massimiliano Blardone  2:25.19 (1:12.53 + 1:12.66) (3) Kjetil Jansrud  2:25.67 (1:14.19 + 1:11.48)
Overall World Cup standings (after 16 events): (1) Raich 533 points (2) Jean-Baptiste Grange  478 (3) Aksel Lund Svindal  470
Women's World Cup in Maribor, Slovenia:
Giant slalom: (1) Tina Maze  2:45.15 (1:21.75 + 1:23.40) (2) Denise Karbon  2:45.54 (1:21.66 + 1:23.88) (3) Kathrin Hoelzl  2:46.07 (1:21.93 + 1:24.14)
Overall World Cup standings (after 14 of 35 events): (1) Maria Riesch  629 points (2) Tanja Poutiainen  584 (3) Lindsey Vonn  566

Biathlon
World Cup 4 in Oberhof, Germany:
10 km Sprint Men: (1) Maxim Tchoudov  25:49.5 (0+0) (2) Michael Roesch  26:02.2 (0+0) (3) Tomasz Sikora  26:14.7 (1+0)

Bobsleigh
World Cup 5 in Königssee, Germany:
Two-man: Thomas Florschuetz/Marc Kühne  1:44.62 (52.20/52.42) (2) Ivo Rüegg/Cedric Grand  1:39.27 (49.54/49.73) (3) Alexandre Zoubkov/Dmitry Trunenkov  1:39.31 (49.58/49.73) & Karl Angerer/Alex Mann  1:39.31 (49.73/49.58)
World Cup standings (after 4 of 8 races): (1) André Lange  795 points (2) Beat Hefti  771 (3) Zoubkov & Todd Hays  672
Two-woman: (1) Shauna Rohbock/Valerie Fleming  1:41.91 (50.78/51.13) (2) Nicole Minichiello/Gillian Cooke  1:42.05 (50.87/51.18) & Sandra Kiriasis/Romy Logsch  1:42.05 (51.02/51.03)
World Cup standings (after 4 of 8 races): (1) Kiriasis 845 points (2) Rohbock 803 (3) Helen Upperton  794

Freestyle skiing
World Cup in Les Contamines, France:
Skicross men: (1) Andreas Matt  (2) Christopher Delbosco  (3) Markus Wittner 
Skicross women: (1) Hedda Berntsen  (2) Ophelie David  (3) Katrin Ofner 

Luge
World Cup 5 in Cesana Pariol, Italy:
Women: (1) Tatjana Hüfner  (2) Natalie Geisenberger  (3) Nina Reithmayer 
World Cup standings (after 5 of 9 races): (1) Hüfner 485 points (2) Geisenberger 415 (3) Anke Wischnewski  322
Doubles: (1) Christian Oberstolz/Patrick Gruber  (2) Gerhard Plankensteiner/Oswald Haselrieder  (3) Andris Sics/Juris Sics 
World Cup standings (after 5 of 9 races): (1) Oberstolz/Gruber 420 points (2) Andreas Linger/Wolfgang Linger  350 (3) Plankensteiner/Haselrieder 319

Nordic combined
World Cup in Val di Fiemme, Italy:
10 km mass start: (1) Bjoern Kircheisen  (2) Bernhard Gruber  (3) Jan Schmid 
Overall World Cup standings (after 10 of 24 events): (1) Anssi Koivuranta  643 points (2) Kircheisen 509 (3) Bill Demong  497

Ski jumping
World Cup in Tauplitz/Bad Mitterndorf, Austria:
200m flying hill: (1) Gregor Schlierenzauer  398.0 points (199.5/215.5m (hill record)) (2) Simon Ammann  390.1 (207.5/195.5) (3) Martin Koch  386.8 (197.5/209.0)
World Cup overall standings (after 12 of 28 events): (1) Ammann 957 points (2) Schlierenzauer 840 (3) Wolfgang Loitzl   775

Snowboarding
World Cup in Bad Gastein, Austria:
Snowboardcross men: (1) Xavier de Le Rue  (2) Michal Novotny  (3) Nate Holland 
Snowboardcross women: (1) Sandra Frei  (2) Déborah Anthonioz  Lindsey Jacobellis 

January 9, 2009 (Friday)

Darts
BDO World Championship in Frimley Green, United Kingdom:
Women's final:  Francis Hoenselaar beat  Trina Gulliver 2–1
Hoenselaar wins her first World Championship title after losing in five previous finals to 7-times champion Gulliver.

Ice hockey
World Women's U18 Championship in Füssen, Germany:
Semifinals:
 6–1 
 18–0 
In a repeat of last year's championships, Canada and United States will play in the final, while Sweden and Czech Republic play for bronze medals.
Classification 5–8:
 1–2(SO) 
 1–2(OT) 

Tennis
Hopman Cup in Perth, Australia:
Final:
 2–0  (doubles match not played)
Dominika Cibulková and Dominik Hrbatý give Slovakia its third Hopman Cup title.
JB Group Classic in Hong Kong:
Gold group final (best of five matches):
Venus Williams  (Americas) bt Anna Chakvetadze  (Russia) 7–6 (7/1), 6–3
Vera Zvonareva  (Russia) bt Gisela Dulko  (Americas) 6–4, 0–6, 6–3
Americas and Russia level 1–1.
Silver group final (best of three matches):
Sania Mirza  (Asia-Pacific) bt Ágnes Szávay  (Europe) 6–3, 6–4
Zheng Jie /Sania Mirza  (Asia-Pacific) bt Jelena Janković /Michelle Larcher de Brito  (Europe) 6–1, 6–1
Asia-Pacific win the silver group final 2–0.

Winter sports

Biathlon
World Cup 4 in Oberhof, Germany:
7.5 km Sprint Women: (1) Ekaterina Iourieva  22:09.7 (1 penalty), (2) Andrea Henkel  at 2.4 (O), (3) Helena Jonsson  19.6 (0)
Overall World Cup standings (after eight rounds): (1) Svetlana Sleptsova  361 points, (2) Iourieva 337, (3) Jonsson 283

Skeleton
World Cup 5 in Königssee, Germany:
Men: (1) Frank Rommel  1:34.91 (47.44/47.47) (2) Florian Grassl  1:35.91 (47.85/48.06) (3) Aleksandr Tretyakov  1:36.03 (48.20/47.83)
World Cup standings (after four races): (1) Grassl 803 points (2) Martins Dukurs  802 (3) Tretyakov 772
Women: (1) Anja Huber  1:38.85 (49.55/49.30) (2) Shelley Rudman  1:39.09 (49.84/49.25) (3) Marion Trott  1:39.20 (49.65/49.55)
World Cup standings (after four races): (1) Huber 811 points (2) Rudman 747 (3) Amy Williams  736

January 8, 2009 (Thursday)

American football
NCAA Bowl Games:
BCS National Championship Game at Miami Gardens, Florida:
(2) Florida 24, (1) Oklahoma 14
 The Gators win their second BCS national title in three seasons as 2007 Heisman Trophy winner Tim Tebow outduels 2008 winner Sam Bradford.

Basketball
Euroleague, week 9:(teams in bold advance to the Top 16 stage; teams in italics are eliminated)
Group A:
Cibona Zagreb  76–77  Unicaja Málaga
Maccabi Tel Aviv  96–83  Olympiacos
Following these results, Málaga move to the top of the group, ahead of Olympiacos and Maccabi.
Group B:
Montepaschi Siena  82–77  Panathinaikos Athens
Žalgiris Kaunas  105–94  SLUC Nancy
Žalgiris draw level with Nancy and Sopot for the 4th and final Top 16 place in the group, and hold tie-break advantage against each one of them, but Sopot would have the edge in case of a 3-way tie.
Group C:Union Olimpija Ljubljana  70–90  Fenerbahçe Ülker
Fenerbahçe punch their ticket to the Top 16.
Lottomatica Roma  96–103(OT)  TAU Cerámica
TAU get the four-point win they needed to secure top spot in the group.
Group D:
AJ Milano  70–61  Real Madrid
Real's loss assures CSKA Moscow of first place in the group. Milano gets level with Partizan Belgrade and Efes Pilsen in 3rd to 5th places, but because of disadvantage in tiebreakers can only advance to the Top 16 if results in other group matches on the final day go their way.

Tennis
Hopman Cup in Perth, Australia:(teams in bold advance to the final)
Group A:
 2–1 
 3–0 
Group B:
 2–1 
 3–0 

Winter sports

Biathlon
World Cup 4 in Oberhof, Germany:
4 x 7.5 km Relay Men: (1)  1hr 19min 36.61sec (0 penalties), (2)  8.7sec behind (0), (3)  19.2 (1)
World Cup relay standings: (1) Austria 174 (2) Russia 154 (3)  124

January 7, 2009 (Wednesday)

Basketball
Euroleague, week 9:(teams in bold advance to the Top 16 stage; teams in italics are eliminated)
Group A:Le Mans  92–88  Air Avellino''
Le Mans score their first win, but it's too late...
Group B:
Asseco Prokom Sopot  64–76  Regal FC Barcelona
Barcelona secure top place in the group which put them in the top seeding group for the draw of the Top 16 stage.
Group C:
DKV Joventut  75–79  ALBA Berlin
ALBA get level with Joventut in 4th place, and take the tie-break advantage against them.
Group D:
Efes Pilsen  55–74  CSKA Moscow
CSKA's win effectively secure them top place in the group, and also assures Real Madrid advance to the Top 16.
Partizan Belgrade  80–57  Panionios
Partizan draw level with Efes Pilsen in 3rd place. Panionios drop to last place and has only a slim chance of qualifying.

Cricket
South Africa in Australia:
3rd Test in Sydney, day 5:
 445 and 257/4d;  327 and 272. Australia win by 103 runs, South Africa win the series 2–1.
West Indies in New Zealand:
3rd ODI in Wellington:
 128 (41.4 ov);  129/3 (20.3 ov). New Zealand win by 7 wickets and level the 5-match series 1–1.
 News:
 In a tumultuous day for the England cricket team, Kevin Pietersen steps down as captain and Peter Moores is sacked as head coach. Andrew Strauss will take over as captain for the upcoming tour of the West Indies.

Ice hockey
Champions Hockey League Semifinals, second leg:(First leg scores in parentheses)
Salavat Yulaev Ufa  1(2)–4(1)  Metallurg Magnitogorsk
Metallurg win in penalty shootout.
Espoo Blues  1(3)–4(6)  ZSC Lions
Lions win 10–4 on aggregate.
World Women's U18 Championship in Füssen, Germany:(teams in bold advance to the semifinals)
Group B:
 4–3 
 13–0 
Group A:
 9–2 
 5–2

Tennis
Hopman Cup in Perth, Australia:
Group A:
 1–2 
Group B:
 2–1

Winter sports

Biathlon
World Cup 4 in Oberhof, Germany:
4 x 6 km Relay Women: (1)  (Svetlana Sleptsova, Olga Zaitseva, Ekaterina Iourieva, Olga Medvedtseva) 1hr 16min 47.7sec (1 penalty), (2)  at 1:10.2 (0), (3)  1:31.4 (2)
World Cup relay standings (after 3 of 6 events): (1) Russia 180 points, (2) Germany 145, (3) France 139

Snowboarding
World Cup in Kreischberg, Austria:
Parallel slalom men: (1) Simon Schoch  (2) Rok Flander  (3) Zan Kosir 
Parallel slalom women: (1) Amelie Kober  (2) Tomoka Takeuchi  (3) Heidi Neururer

January 6, 2009 (Tuesday)

American football
NCAA Bowl Games:
GMAC Bowl: Tulsa 45, (22) Ball State 13

Cricket
South Africa in Australia:
3rd Test in Sydney, day 4:
 445 and 257/4d (Simon Katich 61);  327 and 62/1. South Africa require another 314 runs with 9 wickets remaining.
Sri Lanka in Bangladesh:
2nd Test in Chittagong, day 4
 384 and 447/6d (Tillakaratne Dilshan 143);  208 and 158. Sri Lanka win by 465 runs and win the series 2–0.

Ice hockey
World Women's U18 Championship in Füssen, Germany:(teams in bold advance to the semifinals)
Group B:
 7–3 
 0–6 
Group A:
 6–1 
 0–11

Tennis
Hopman Cup in Perth, Australia:
Group B:
 1–2 
Group A:
 1–2

Winter sports

Alpine skiing
Men's World Cup in Zagreb, Croatia:
Slalom: (1) Jean-Baptiste Grange  1:53.31 (53.91 + 59.40) (2) Ivica Kostelic  1:53.36 (54.18 + 59.18) (3) Giuliano Razzoli  1:53.66 (54.88 + 58.78)
Overall World Cup standings (after 15 races): (1) Grange 466pts, (2) Aksel Lund Svindal  444, (3) Benjamin Raich  433

Ski jumping
Four Hills Tournament:
World Cup in Bischofshofen, Austria:
Individual 140m hill: (1) Wolfgang Loitzl  301.2 points (142.5/141.5m) (2) Simon Ammann  284.4 (137.5/140.5) (3) Dimitry Vassiliev  279.2 (138.0/138.5)
Final Four Hills standings: (1) Loitzl 1123.7 points (2) Ammann 1091.1 (3) Gregor Schlierenzauer  1077.1
Overall World Cup standings (after 11 of 28 events): (1) Ammann 877 points (2) Schlierenzauer 740 (3) Loitzl 739

Snowboarding
World Cup in Kreischberg, Austria:
Parallel GS men: (1) Siegfried Grabner  (2) Simon Schoch  (3)Meinhard Erlacher 
Parallel GS women: (1) Doris Guenther  (2) Tomoka Takeuchi  (3) Claudia Riegler

January 5, 2009 (Monday)

American football
NCAA Bowl Games:
Bowl Championship Series
Fiesta Bowl: (3) Texas 24, (10) Ohio State 21.
Colt McCoy's 26-yard pass to Quan Cosby with 16 seconds left wins the game for the Longhorns.

Baseball
Philadelphia Phillies reliever JC Romero and Sergio Mitre of the New York Yankees are both suspended for the first 50 games of the 2009 season after violating substance policy rules.
Carl Pohlad, owner of the Minnesota Twins, dies at the age of 93 in Minneapolis.

Cricket
South Africa in Australia:
3rd Test in Sydney, day 3:
 445 and 33/0;  327 (Mark Boucher 89). Australia lead by 151 runs with 10 wickets remaining.
Sri Lanka in Bangladesh:
2nd Test in Chittagong, day 3:
 384 and 296/4 (Tillakaratne Dilshan 81*);  208. Sri Lanka lead by 472 runs with 6 wickets remaining.

Ice hockey
World Junior Championships in Ottawa, Ontario, Canada
Gold Medal Game:
 1–5 
Canada wins its fifth consecutive gold medal, matching their own record set from 1993–1997.
Bronze Medal Game:
 2–5 
World Women's U18 Championship in Füssen, Germany:
Group B:
 1–2(SO) 
 16–1 
Group A:
 17–0 
 8–1

Tennis
Hopman Cup in Perth, Australia:
Group A:
 1–2 
 0–3

Winter sports

Freestyle skiing
World Cup in St. Johann in Tirol, Austria:
Skicross men: (1) Michael Schmid  (2) Andreas Matt  (3) Tommy Eliasson 
Skicross women: (1) Marion Josserand  (2) Katharina Gutensohn  (3) Kelsey Serwa

January 4, 2009 (Sunday)

American football
NFL Playoffs Wild card round:(Seedings in parentheses)
AFC: (6) Baltimore Ravens 27, (3) Miami Dolphins 9
Ed Reed's 64-yard interception return for a touchdown was the turning point for Baltimore.
NFC: (6) Philadelphia Eagles 26, (3) Minnesota Vikings 14
Donovan McNabb's 79-yard touchdown pass to Brian Westbrook was the difference as the Eagles beat the NFC North champions.
Next week's Divisional Round will be rematches of regular season games with the Arizona Cardinals visiting the Carolina Panthers and the Eagles visiting the New York Giants in the NFC, while the Ravens visit the Tennessee Titans and the San Diego Chargers making a trip to the Pittsburgh Steelers in the AFC.

Cricket
South Africa in Australia:
3rd Test in Sydney, day 2:
 445 (Michael Clarke 138),  125/1. South Africa trail by 320 runs with 9 wickets remaining in the 1st innings.
Sri Lanka in Bangladesh:
2nd Test in Chittagong, day 2:
 384 (Tillakaratne Dilshan 162) and 13/0;  208 (Mashrafe Mortaza 63). Sri Lanka lead by 189 runs with 10 wickets remaining.

Darts
PDC World Darts Championship in London, United Kingdom:
Final:
 Phil Taylor def.  Raymond van Barneveld 7–1

Ice hockey
World Junior Championships in Ottawa, Ontario, Canada
Relegation Round (at the Ottawa Civic Centre):
 1–3 
 1–7 
Germany and Kazakhstan are relegated to Division 1 in 2010.
5th place Playoff (at Scotiabank Place):
 3–2(OT)

Tennis
Hopman Cup in Perth, Australia:
Group B:
 2–1

Winter sports

Alpine skiing
Women's World Cup in Zagreb, Croatia:
Slalom: (1) Maria Riesch  1min 58.96sec (58.60 + 1:00.36) (2) Nicole Gius  1:59.40 (1:00.15 + 59.25) (3) Šárka Záhrobská  1:59.59 (59.79 + 59.80)
Overall standings (after 13 of 35 races): (1) Riesch 607pts, (2) Tanja Poutiainen  534, (3) Lindsey Vonn  530

Cross-country skiing
Tour de Ski stage 7 in Val di Fiemme, Italy:
Men Final standings: (1) Dario Cologna  2hr 46min 05.4sec, (2) Petter Northug  at 59.0sec, (3) Axel Teichmann  1min 02.8sec
Overall World Cup standings (after 15 of 33 races): (1) Cologna 835 points, (2) Teichmann 661, (3) Northug 618
Women Final standings: (1) Virpi Kuitunen  2hr 06min 41.4sec, (2) Aino-Kaisa Saarinen  at 7.2sec, (3) Petra Majdič  34.5
Overall World Cup standings (after 14 of 33 races): (1) Saarinen 978 points, (2) Kuitunen 907, (3) Majdic 893

Luge
World Cup 4 in Königssee, Germany:
Men: (1) Armin Zöggeler  (2) David Möller  (3) Felix Loch 
Overall standings (after 4 of 9 races): (1) Zöggeler 355 (2) Möller 325 (3) Andi Langenhan  227

Nordic combined
World Cup in Schonach, Germany:
10 km Gundersen: (1) Anssi Koivuranta  22min 15.4sec (1) (2) Bill Demong  at 6.7 (18) (3) Bjorn Kircheisen  7.1 (19)
Overall standings (after 9 of 24 races): (1) Koivuranta 643 points (2) Demong 447 (3) Magnus Moan  420

Ski jumping
Four Hills Tournament:
World Cup in Innsbruck, Austria:
Individual 130m hill: (1) Wolfgang Loitzl  261.0 points (126.5m/128.5m) (2) Gregor Schlierenzauer  260.3 (126.0/127.5) (3) Martin Schmitt  257.7 (128.5/125.5)
Four Hills Tournament standings (after 3 of 4 events): (1) Loitzl 822.5 points (2) Simon Ammann  806.7 (3) Schlierenzauer 798.0
World Cup standings (after 10 of 28 events): (1) Ammann 797 points (2) Schlierenzauer 690 (3) Loitzl 639

January 3, 2009 (Saturday)

American football
NFL Playoffs Wild card round:(Seedings in parentheses)
NFC: (4) Arizona Cardinals 30, (5) Atlanta Falcons 24
 The Cardinals win in their first home playoff game since 1947.
AFC: (4) San Diego Chargers 23, (5) Indianapolis Colts 17 (OT)
 Darren Sproles' 22-yard rushing TD sends the Chargers to the Divisional playoffs for the third consecutive season.
NCAA Bowl Games:
International Bowl: Connecticut 38, Buffalo 20
The Huskies score 28 unanswered points to come back from a ten-point deficit.

Cricket
South Africa in Australia:
3rd Test in Sydney, day 1:
 267/6 (Michael Clarke 73*, Dale Steyn 2/71).
Sri Lanka in Bangladesh:
2nd Test in Chittagong, day 1:
 371/6 (Tillakaratne Dilshan 162, Mashrafe Mortaza 2/48).
West Indies in New Zealand:
2nd ODI in Christchurch:
 152/8 (Jesse Ryder 32, Fidel Edwards 3/26);  158/5 (Ramnaresh Sarwan 67*, Jacob Oram 1/25). Match reduced to 28 overs each by rain. West Indies win by 5 wickets (D/L method) and lead 5-match series 1–0.

Ice hockey
World Junior Championships in Ottawa, Ontario, Canada
Relegation Round (at the Ottawa Civic Centre):
 7–1 
Semifinals (at Scotiabank Place):
 5–3 
 6–5(SO)

Tennis
Capitala World Tennis Championship in Abu Dhabi, United Arab Emirates:
Final:
Andy Murray  def. Rafael Nadal  6–4, 5–7, 6–3
Hopman Cup in Perth, Australia:
Group B:
 3–0

Winter sports

Cross-country skiing
Tour de Ski stage 6 in Val di Fiemme, Italy:
10 km classic women mass start: (1) Virpi Kuitunen  30min 10.3sec, (2) Petra Majdič  at 13.8sec, (3) Aino-Kaisa Saarinen  20.5
Overall standings (after 6 of 7 stages): (1) Kuitunen 1hr 29min 14.5sec, (2) Saarinen at 31.7sec, (3) Majdic (SLO) 49.1
20 km classic men mass start, 15:30 CET: (1) Axel Teichmann  55min 19.2sec, (2) Sami Jauhojärvi  at 0.3sec, (3) Nikolai Chebotko  1.3
Overall standings (after 6 of 7 stages): (1) Dario Cologna  2hr 20min 53.4sec, (2) Teichmann 2hr 21:27.5, (3) Eldar Roenning  2hr 21:58.6

Luge
World Cup 4 in Königssee, Germany:
Women: (1) Tatjana Hüfner  (2) Natalie Geisenberger  (3) Anke Wischnewski 
Overall standings (after 4 of 9 races): (1) Hüfner 385 (2) Geisenberger 330 (3)Wischnewski 280
Doubles: (1) Patric Leitner/Alexander Resch  (2) Tobias Wendl/Tobias Arlt  (3) Andreas Linger/Wolfgang Linger 
Overall standings (after 4 of 9 races): (1) Christian Oberstolz/Patrick Gruber  320 (2) Linger/Linger 290 (3) Leitner/Resch 264

Nordic combined
World Cup in Schonach, Germany:
4x5km Team: (1)  43:28.1 (2)  43:47.7 (3)  44:02.8

January 2, 2009 (Friday)

American football
NCAA Bowl Games:(BCS ranking in parentheses)
Cotton Bowl Classic: (25) Mississippi 47, (8) Texas Tech 34
Liberty Bowl:  Kentucky 25, East Carolina 19
 The Wildcats win three straight bowl games for the first time in school history.
Bowl Championship Series:
Sugar Bowl: (6) Utah 31, (4) Alabama 17
 The Utes jump to a 21–0 lead in the first quarter and never look back, finishing as this season's only unbeaten Division I FBS team.

Ice hockey
World Junior Championships in Ottawa, Ontario, Canada
Relegation Round (at the Ottawa Civic Centre):
 1–7 
Quarterfinals (at Scotiabank Place):
 3–5 
 5–1

January 1, 2009 (Thursday)

American football
NCAA Bowl Games:(BCS ranking in parentheses)
Outback Bowl: Iowa 31, South Carolina 10
Gator Bowl: Nebraska 26, Clemson 21
Capital One Bowl: (15) Georgia 24, (18) Michigan State 12
Bowl Championship Series
Rose Bowl:  (5) Southern California 38, (8) Penn State 24
Orange Bowl: (19) Virginia Tech 20, (12) Cincinnati 7
The Hokies' win ends an eight-game BCS losing streak for the ACC.

Ice hockey
2009 NHL Winter Classic at Wrigley Field, Chicago:
Detroit Red Wings 6, Chicago Blackhawks 4
The Wings won the 701st meeting of these Original Six rivals in front of 40,818 fans.

Winter sports

Cross-country skiing
Tour de Ski stage 5 in Nove Mesto, Czech Republic:
1.2 km Sprint freestyle men: (1) Petter Northug  (2) Tor Arne Hetland  (3) Cristian Zorzi 
Overall standings (after five of seven Tour de Ski rounds): (1) Dario Cologna  1 hr 26 min 02.4 sec (2) Vasily Rochev  1 h 26:25.9 (3) Eldar Rønning  1 h 26:34.9
1.2 km Sprint freestyle women: (1) Arianna Follis  (2) Petra Majdič  (3) Aino-Kaisa Saarinen 
Overall standings (after five of seven Tour de Ski rounds): (1) Saarinen 59:30.4 (2) Virpi Kuitunen  at 13.8 (3) Marit Bjørgen  37.0

Ski jumping
Four Hills Tournament:
World Cup in Garmisch-Partenkirchen, Germany:
Individual 140m hill: (1) Wolfgang Loitzl  276.3 points (134.5/136.5m) (2) Simon Ammann  274.6 (140.0/134.5) (3) Harri Olli  258.6 (133.0/131.5)
Four Hills standings (after two of four events): (1) Loitzl 561.5 points (2) Ammann 561.0 (3) Gregor Schlierenzauer  537.7
World Cup standings (after 9 of 28 events): (1) Ammann 765 points (2) Schlierenzauer 610 (3) Loitzl 539

References

1